The following list contains only notable graduates and former students of Columbia College, the undergraduate liberal arts division of Columbia University, and its predecessor, from 1754 to 1776, King's College. For a full list of individuals associated with the university as a whole, see the List of Columbia University people. An asterisk (*) indicates a former student who did not graduate.

Founding fathers of the United States
 John Jay (King's 1764), President of the Continental Congress; first Chief Justice of the United States; author of five of The Federalist papers; first Secretary of Foreign Affairs under the Articles of Confederation; architect of Jay Treaty with Great Britain
 Robert Livingston (King's 1764), a writer of the Declaration of Independence as part of the Committee of Five; first United States Secretary of Foreign Affairs; negotiator of the Louisiana Purchase 
 Egbert Benson (King's 1765), delegate to the Continental Congress, U.S. Representatives, first New York State Attorney General, chief justice of the New York Supreme Court
 Gouverneur Morris (King's 1768), represented Pennsylvania in the Continental Congress; authored much of the United States Constitution; United States Ambassador to France; United States Senator from New York
 Alexander Hamilton* (King's 1776), American Revolutionary War officer, aide-de-camp to George Washington; most prolific writer of The Federalist Papers; first United States Secretary of the Treasury, portrayed on the ten-dollar bill; founder of the Bank of New York

Scholars
 Clement Clarke Moore (1798), son of bishop Benjamin Moore; professor of Oriental and Greek literature; attributed author of The Night Before Christmas
 John Anthon (1801), jurist
 John Church Hamilton (1809), son of Alexander Hamilton, American historian
 Charles Anthon (1815), classical scholar and translator known for the Anthon Transcript
 Henry Drisler (1839), classical scholar and acting president of Columbia College
 Julius Sachs (1867), founder of Dwight School, professor at Teachers College, Columbia University and scion of the Goldman–Sachs family
 William Milligan Sloane (1868), historian, president of the American Academy of Arts and Letters and founder of the United States Olympic Committee
 Felix Adler (1870), professor of political and social ethics, founder of the Ethical Culture movement and the Ethical Culture Fieldston School
 Brander Matthews (1871), first professor of dramatic literature in the United States
Charles Waldstein (A.M. 1873), Anglo-American archeologist, director of the Fitzwilliam Museum and American School of Classical Studies at Athens; first Jewish American athlete in the Olympic Games
 John Aaron Browning (1875), American educator, founder of the Browning School
 Richard T. Ely (1876), American economist, founder and president of the American Economic Association
 Edward Washburn Hopkins (1878), professor of Sanskrit at Yale University
 Edwin Robert Anderson Seligman (1879), American economist
 William Archibald Dunning (1881), founder of the Dunning School of Reconstruction
 James Chidester Egbert Jr. (1881), classical scholar and educator
 Richard James Horatio Gottheil (1881), American Zionist scholar, founder of the first Jewish fraternity Zeta Beta Tau
 Harry Thurston Peck (1881), literary critic and editor of The Bookman
 A. V. Williams Jackson (1883), American specialist on Indo-European languages
 Charles Knapp (1887), classical scholar
Frank Moore Colby (1888), American historian and editor of The New International Encyclopedia
 Charles Sears Baldwin (1888), American scholar and professor of rhetoric at Yale University
 John Dyneley Prince (1888), American linguist; United States Ambassador to Yugoslavia
 George Louis Beer (1892), renowned historian of the "Imperial school"
Benjamin Lord Buckley (1892), American educator, founder and headmaster of Buckley School
 Judah A. Joffe (1893), Yiddish philologist
 William Robert Shepherd (1893), American cartographer, historian
 John Driscoll Fitz-Gerald (1895), American Hispanic scholar
 Joel Elias Spingarn (1895), professor of comparative literature
 Mortimer Lamson Earle (1896), American classical scholar
 Alfred L. Kroeber (1896), pioneering cultural anthropologist
 Frederick Paul Keppel (1898), American educator, former president of the Carnegie Corporation of New York
 Frank Sutliff Hackett (1899), American educator, founder of Riverdale Country School
 John Erskine (1900), Great Books pioneer
 Alexander Goldenweiser (1902), Russian-born anthropologist and sociologist
 Emanuel Goldenweiser (1903), economist and president of the American Economic Association
 Robert Livingston Schuyler (1903), scholar on American history, president of the American Historical Association
 Carlton J. H. Hayes (1904), pioneering cultural historian; former United States Ambassador to Spain
 Edward Sapir (1904), linguist and co-creator of the Sapir–Whorf hypothesis
 Frank Speck (1904), anthropologist, professor at the University of Pennsylvania
 William Stuart Messer (1905), professor of Latin at Dartmouth College, recipient of a 1922 Rome Prize
 Mark Raymond Harrington (1907), curator at the Southwest Museum of the American Indian and owner of the Rómulo Pico Adobe
 Edwin Borchard (1908), International legal scholar; Sterling Professor at the Yale Law School
 Richard F. Bach (1909), curator with the Metropolitan Museum of Art
 Rhys Carpenter (1909), American classical art historian and professor at Bryn Mawr College
 F. Stuart Chapin (1909), American sociologist and former president of the American Sociological Association
 Harold Gould Henderson (1910), American Japanologist and former president of the Japan Society, founder of the Haiku Society of America
 Armin K. Lobeck (1911), American cartographer
Carl Zigrosser (1911), curator of the Philadelphia Museum of Art
 Lawrence K. Frank (1912), social scientist; vice president of the Josiah Macy Jr. Foundation and co-initiator of the Macy conferences
 Arthur MacMahon (1912), American political scientist, president of the American Political Science Association
 Clarence Manning (1912), prominent slavicist at Columbia University
 Parker LeRoy Moon (1913), professor and managing editor of the Political Science Quarterly
 Benjamin Graham (1914), economist who pioneered value investing
Herbert Schneider (1915), German American professor of philosophy and religious studies scholar
 Irwin Edman (1916), philosopher
 Thomas Munro (1916), art historian at Case Western Reserve University and curator at Cleveland Museum of Art
 John Herman Randall Jr. (1918), philosopher
 Kenneth Burke* (1920), American literary theorist and philosopher
 Thomas Ollive Mabbott (1920), professor of literature at Hunter College; expert on Edgar Allan Poe
 Richard McKeon (1920), philosopher
 Frank Tannenbaum (1920), Austrian-American historian, sociologist, and criminologist; founder of the Labeling theory in criminology
 Fritz Roethlisberger (1921), management theorist at Harvard Business School
 Louis M. Hacker (1922), professor of economics and proponent of adult education
 Yuan Tung-li (1922), former director of the National Library of China, Peking University professor
 Mortimer Adler* (1923), philosopher and Great Books pioneer
 Robert Beverly Hale (1923), curator of American paintings at the Metropolitan Museum of Art
 Alexander Lesser (1923), anthropologist known for his documentation of the Kitsai language
 Arthur V. Loughren (1923), electrical engineer, former president of the Institute of Radio Engineers
 Leslie White (1923), American anthropologist known for his theories of the evolution of culture and for the scientific study of culture
 John Gassner (1924), historian of theater, Sterling Professor at Yale University
 Meyer Schapiro (1924), art historian
 Joseph Campbell (1925), mythologist
Jerome Klein (1925), American art historian and co-founder of the American Artists' Congress
 William York Tindall (1925), James Joyce scholar at Columbia University
 Lionel Trilling (1925), literary critic
 Dwight C. Miner (1926), historian
 Jacques Barzun (1927), cultural historian
 Elliott Van Kirk Dobbie, historian, scholar of Anglo-Saxon literature
 Robert C. Schnitzer (1927), arts teacher and administrator
 Francis Steegmuller (1927), Flaubert scholar
 Gustave Von Groschwitz (1927), former director of the Carnegie Museum of Art
 Carl Benjamin Boyer (1928), historian of science and mathematics
 Leon Keyserling (1928), head of the Council of Economic Advisers under Harry S Truman
 Edgar Lorch (1928), mathematics department chairman at Columbia University
Junius Bird (1930), American archaeologist and former curator of South American Archaeology at the American Museum of Natural History
 Eli Ginzberg (1930), professor of economics at Columbia University
Niels Henry Sonne (1930), rare book collector and head librarian at General Theological Seminary
 Maxwell Geismar (1931), American literary critic, author, and professor at Sarah Lawrence College
 Francis Joseph Murray (1932), mathematician who developed the Von Neumann algebra with John von Neumann
 Walter H. Rubsamen (1933), professor of a musicology at the University of California, Los Angeles
 Joseph Leon Blau (1934), professor of religion at Columbia University
 M. A. Fitzsimons (1934), historian at the University of Notre Dame, editor of The Review of Politics
 Alan Gewirth (1934), American philosopher, professor of philosophy at the University of Chicago, author of Reason and Morality
 Robert M. Adams (1935), Kafka scholar and professor at the University of California, Los Angeles
 Frederick Hartt (1935), Michelangelo expert, professor at University of Virginia, member of the Monuments, Fine Arts, and Archives program
 Herbert Aptheker (1936), Marxist historian and political activist
 Maurice Matloff (1936), Chief Historian of the United States Army from 1970 to 1981
 John Alexander Moore (1936), professor of zoology at University of California, Riverside
 Joseph Greenberg (1936), prominent linguist known for work in linguistic typology and genetic classification of languages
 Carl E. Schorske (1936), cultural historian and winner of the 1981 Pulitzer Prize for History
 Quentin Anderson (1937), cultural historian and literary critic
 Charles Frankel (1937), political philosopher, Assistant Secretary of State for Educational and Cultural Affairs
Herbert Hyman (1939), American sociologist and expert on Opinion polling
Herbert E. Klarman (1939), American professor of the economics of healthcare at New York University
 Barry Ulanov (1939), English professor and scholar of jazz and religion
 Robert J. Alexander (1940), American political activist, writer, and professor at Rutgers University
 John Hine Mundy (1940), British-American medievalist, professor at Columbia University, former president of the Medieval Academy of America
 Donald Barr (1941), American educator and author; former headmaster of Dalton School; initiated the Columbia University Science Honors Program
 Ted de Bary (1941), East Asian studies expert and provost of Columbia University
 Leon Henkin (1941), mathematician and logician at University of California, Berkeley
 Donald Keene (1942), scholar of Japanese culture
 Robert Lekachman (1942), economist
 Philip Yampolsky (1942), scholar of Zen Buddhism
 Francesco Cordasco (1943), professor of education at Montclair State University
 Bernard Russell Gelbaum (1943), professor of mathematics at University of California, Irvine
 Martin S. James (1943), American art historian, translator of Piet Mondrian
 Martin J. Klein (1943), American historian of science and recipient of the Abraham Pais Prize for History of Physics
 Bernard Weisberger (1943), American historian of the Reconstruction Era
 Alan Hoffman (1944), mathematician known for constructing the Hoffman–Singleton graph
 Bruce Mazlish (1944), American historian and professor at Massachusetts Institute of Technology, son-in-law of David Rockefeller
 Richard Popkin (1944), American philosopher
 Jack Greenberg (1945), counsel for the NAACP, in which capacity he argued Brown v. Board of Education; former professor at Columbia Law School and dean of Columbia College
 Murray Rothbard (1945), leading exponent of the Austrian School of economics
Gilbert Y. Steiner (1945), American scholar of social policy and fourth president of the Brookings Institution
 Richard Heffner (1946), professor and host of The Open Mind
 Fritz Stern (1946), Seth Low Professor of History Emeritus; pre-eminent in German studies
 George Herbert Borts (1947), economist at Brown University and managing editor of The American Economic Review from 1969 to 1980
 William Bell Dinsmoor Jr. (1947), Classical archaeologist and architectural historian
John Michael Montias (1947), American economist and art historian at Yale University
Harold E. Pagliaro (1947), professor of English literature at Swarthmore College
Howard Stein (1947), philosopher at the University of Chicago
 Lambros Comitas (1948), anthropologist
 Elihu Katz (1948), sociologist and communication scholar, known for developing the two-step flow of communication theory
 Norman Kelvin (1948), literary scholar, professor at City College of New York and Graduate Center, CUNY
 Victorino Tejera (1948), professor of philosophy and comparative literature at Stony Brook University
Uriel Weinreich (1948), linguist and professor at Columbia University
 Albert Elsen (1949), professor at Stanford University and Auguste Rodin expert
 Donald M. Friedman (1949), professor of Renaissance literature at University of California, Berkeley
 Marvin Harris (1949), American anthropologist famous for developing cultural materialism
 Anthony Leeds (1949), anthropologist, professor at Boston University
Robert F. Murphy (1949), professor of anthropology at Columbia University
 Arthur Melvin Okun (1949), chairman of the Council of Economic Advisers, proposed Okun's law
William Rubin (1949), curator at the Museum of Modern Art
James P. Shenton (1949), American historian, professor of Columbia University, mentor of Bancroft Prize winners
John D. Rosenberg (1950), American scholar of Victorian literature, professor at Columbia University
 Burton Watson (1950), American scholar and translator of Chinese and Japanese literature
George Keller (1951), professor of higher education studies at the University of Pennsylvania
 Joseph Rothschild (1951), professor of Central European and Eastern European history at Columbia University
 Immanuel Wallerstein (1951), sociologist who defined world-systems theory
 A. James Gregor (1952), professor of political science at the University of California, Berkeley
 Elliott Mendelson (1952), American logician; professor of mathematics at Queens College, City University of New York
 Andrew P. Vayda (1952), professor emeritus of anthropology and ecology at Rutgers University
 Melvin Ember (1953), professor of the City University of New York and editor of Cross-Cultural Research
Julian Wolpert (1953), professor of urban planning at the Princeton School of Public and International Affairs
 Demetrios James Caraley (1954), editor of Political Science Quarterly and president of the Academy of Political Science
 Peter Kenen (1954), provost, Columbia University and expert in Optimum currency area theory
 Henry Littlefield (1954), educator, author, historian who initiated political interpretations of The Wonderful Wizard of Oz
 Stephen Orgel (1954), Shakespeare and Renaissance literature scholar
 David Rosand (1954), Art historian, Columbia University
 Haldon Chase (1955), Denver-based archeologist, early figure of the Beat Generation
 Warren I. Cohen (1955), historian at University of Maryland, Baltimore County
 Harry N. Scheiber (1955), professor and director of the Institute for Legal Research at the UC Berkeley School of Law
 Jerry Fodor (1956), philosopher at Rutgers University
 Roy Lubove (1956), professor of social welfare at the University of Pittsburgh
 Seymour J. Mandelbaum (1956), professor at the University of Pennsylvania School of Design
 Kenneth Silverman (1956), professor at New York University and Pulitzer Prize-winning biographer
 Robert Alter (1957), professor of Hebrew and comparative literature at the University of California, Berkeley; president of the Association of Literary Scholars, Critics, and Writers
 Stanley Corngold (1957), professor of literature at Princeton University
 George Dargo (1957), American legal scholar, professor at New England Law Boston
 Erich S. Gruen (1957), American classicist and ancient historian; president of the Society for Classical Studies in 1992
Stanley Insler (1957), American philologist and professor at Yale University
 Jonathan Lubin (1957), professor of mathematics at Brown University; introduced Lubin–Tate formal group law
 Robert Chazan (1958), professor of Judaic studies at New York University
 Gerald Feldman (1958), American historian who specializes in 20th-century German history; professor at University of California, Berkeley
 Robert M. Fogelson (1958), American urban historian at Massachusetts Institute of Technology
 Robert W. Hanning (1958), professor of English literature at Columbia University
 Neil Harris (1958), professor of art history at the University of Chicago
 Joachim Neugroschel (1958), prolific multilingual translator
 David Rothman (1958), professor of social medicine and president of the Institute on Medicine as a Profession
 John Clubbe (1959), professor of English at the University of Kentucky
 Benjamin Cohen (1959), political economist and authority on International political economy
 Richard Fremantle (1959), Anglo-American art historian, son of writer Anne Fremantle
 Robert Nozick (1959), libertarian philosopher known for his book Anarchy, State, and Utopia
 Isser Woloch (1959), historian of the French Revolution
 Arnold A. Offner (1959), professor of history at Lafayette College and past president of Society for Historians of American Foreign Relations
 Riordan Roett (1959), political scientist and Latin American specialist at Johns Hopkins University
 Bruce M. Stave (1959), American historian specializing in oral history and urban history
 Alvin Goldman (1960), professor of philosophy at Rutgers University and leading figure in epistemology
 William Landes (1960), economist and professor at University of Chicago Law School
 Rudolf Makkreel (1960), professor of philosophy at Emory University
 Thomas Vargish (1960), professor of English at Dartmouth College
 Eugene Bardach (1961), public policy scholar, professor at University of California, Berkeley
 Marshall Berman (1961), urbanologist
 Martin Eidelberg (1961), art historian at Rutgers University
 David Konstan (1961), professor of classics at New York University
Victor Hao Li (1961), professor at Stanford Law School, President of East–West Center from 1981 to 1989
Donald F. Roberts (1961), professor of communications at Stanford University
 David Syrett (1961), professor of military history at Queens College, City University of New York; former president of the New York Military Affairs Symposium
 Zvi Gitelman (1962), Jewish scholar at the University of Michigan
 Ken Jowitt (1962), American political scientist and professor at University of California, Berkeley and senior fellow of the Hoover Institution
 Stephen Koss (1962), American historian on British history
 Joel Moses (1962), mathematician, Institute Professor at and provost of the Massachusetts Institute of Technology
 Lawrence S. Wittner (1962), historian on peace movements
 Peter Winn (1962), professor of history at Tufts University
 Richard Alba (1963), American sociologist, professor at Graduate Center, CUNY
 David Berlinski (1963), American mathematician, professor at 
 Eric Foner (1963), preeminent historian of Reconstruction, winner of the Pulitzer Prize for History and former president of American Historical Association
 David Orme-Johnson (1963), professor of psychology at the Maharishi University of Management
 Michael Klare (1963), professor of security studies at Hampshire College
 Victor Margolin (1963), professor of design history at the University of Illinois at Chicago
 Jonah Raskin (1963), American writer, professor on counterculture
 Howard Spodek (1963), American historian specializing in urban studies; professor at Temple University
 Robert J. Art (1964), professor of international relations at Brandeis University
 Richard P. Appelbaum (1964), professor of sociology at University of California, Santa Barbara
 Jonathan R. Cole (1964), American sociologist and provost of Columbia University from 1989 to 2003
 Peter S. Donaldson (1964), professor of English literature at the Massachusetts Institute of Technology
 Richard Epstein (1964), libertarian law scholar
 Richard S. Kayne (1964), professor of linguistics at New York University
Peter Kolchin (1964), professor at the University of Delaware and winner of the 1988 Bancroft Prize
 John H. Langbein (1964), Sterling Professor at Yale Law School
 Peter K. Machamer (1964), American philosopher and historian of science; professor at the University of Pittsburgh
 Mike Wallace (1964), historian and winner of the 1999 Pulitzer Prize for History for Gotham: A History of New York City to 1898
 Jonathan Goldberg (1964), professor at Emory University
 Michael M. Gunter (1964), professor at Tennessee Technological University, authority in Kurdish studies
 Miles Orvell (1964), professor at Temple University, former editor of the Encyclopedia of American Studies
 Jonathan M. Weiss (1964), American scholar of French literature and politics
George R. Goldner (1965), former curator at the Metropolitan Museum of Art
 J. Bruce Jacobs (1965), Australian orientalist who specialized in Taiwan studies, professor at Monash University
 Richard Kagan (1965), American historian, professor of Spanish history at Johns Hopkins University
 Richard Taruskin (1965), American musicologist
 Walter Reich (1965), former director of United States Holocaust Memorial Museum and professor at George Washington University
 Mark Steiner (1965), professor of philosophy at the Hebrew University of Jerusalem
 Raymond Geuss (1966), specialist in Jürgen Habermas
 Steven Handel (1966), restoration ecologist, professor at Rutgers University
Michael Hechter (1966), professor of political science at Arizona State University
 Ira Katznelson (1966), American political scientist and historian, professor at Columbia University
 Mark D. Naison (1966), former political activist; professor of history at Fordham University
 T. J. Pempel (1966), professor of political science and former director of the Institute of Asian Studies at the University of California, Berkeley
 Roger Sanjek (1966), professor of anthropology at Queens College, City University of New York
 David Weissbrodt (1966), legal scholar at the University of Minnesota Law School known for drafting the Minnesota Protocol
 Jay Winter (1966), World War I specialist at Yale University
 Paul Gewirtz (1967), constitutional law scholar
 Karl Klare (1967), Critical Legal Studies theorist
 Norman Friedman (1967), American author and naval analyst
 Mott T. Greene (1967), historian of science, professor at University of Puget Sound
 Reza Sheikholeslami (1967), Soudavar Professor of Persian Studies at Wadham College, Oxford
Jeremy Siegel (1967), professor of the Wharton School of the University of Pennsylvania
 Terrell Carver (1968), political theorist; professor at the University of Bristol
 Samuel R. Gross (1968), professor at the University of Michigan Law School; editor of the National Registry of Exonerations project
 Charles Lindholm (1968), University Professor of Anthropology at Boston University  
 Alfred W. McCoy (1968), historian of Southeast Asia; professor at the University of Wisconsin–Madison
 Lawrence Susskind (1968), urban planner and mediator; professor at the Massachusetts Institute of Technology
 Jerry Avorn (1969), professor at the Harvard Medical School
William Boone Bonvillian (1969), scholar of innovation technology policy, former director of MIT's Washington, D.C. office 
 Chris Iijima (1969), legal scholar, folksinger
 Andrei Markovits (1969), professor of comparative politics at the University of Michigan
 Michel Rosenfeld (1969), constitutional law scholar
 Mark Rosenzweig (1969), professor of economics at Yale University
 Michael D. Aeschliman (1970), professor at Boston University and Università della Svizzera italiana
 Steven M. Cohen (1970), sociologist, director of Berman Jewish Policy Archive at NYU's Robert F. Wagner Graduate School of Public Service
 Sheldon Danziger (1970), political scientist at the University of Michigan
 Lennard J. Davis (1970), professor of English at the University of Illinois at Chicago, specialist in disability studies
 John D'Emilio (1970), professor of history and gender studies at the University of Illinois at Chicago; winner of the Bill Whitehead Award in 2013
 Samuel Estreicher (1970), professor at the New York University School of Law
 Peter Grossman (1970), professor of economics at Butler University; columnist, The Indianapolis Star
Robert A. Leonard (1970), American forensic linguist at Hofstra University and former member of rock band Sha Na Na
Michael P. Mezzatesta (1970), art historian, director of the Nasher Museum of Art from 1987 to 2003
 Paul Starr (1970), sociologist; co-founder of The American Prospect and winner of the 1984 Pulitzer Prize for General Non-Fiction
 Paul Berman (1971), historian and social critic
 Philip Nord (1971), historian and professor at Princeton University
 Steven J. Ross (1971), historian and professor at University of Southern California, 2018 Pulitzer Prize for History finalist
 Roy Rosenzweig (1971), historian and director of the Center for History and New Media at George Mason University
 Scott Atran (1972), American anthropologist; director at Centre National de la Recherche Scientifique and presidential scholar at John Jay College of Criminal Justice
 Joel Black (1972), literature and film scholar
 Michael Gerrard (1972), professor at Columbia Law School
 Jerome Groopman (1972), Harvard Medical School professor and medical writer for The New Yorker
 Robert Hymes (1972), professor of Chinese history at Columbia University, winner of two Joseph Levenson Book Prizes
 George Klosko (1972), professor of philosophy at the University of Virginia
 Mark J. Roe (1972), professor at Harvard Law School
 John Servos (1972), professor and historian of science; president of the History of Science Society
 David Stern (1972), professor of Hebrew literature at Harvard University
 Tom R. Tyler (1972), professor of psychology at Yale Law School
 Harold Aram Veeser (1972), professor at City College of New York, known for contribution to new historicism
 Sean Wilentz (1972), historian and winner of the Bancroft Prize; chair of American Studies at Princeton University
 Angelo Falcón (1973), political scientist, President and Founder of the National Institute for Latino Policy
 Steven Messner (1973), sociologist, professor of the University at Albany, SUNY, former president of the American Society of Criminology
 William C. Sharpe (1973), professor of English at Barnard College
 Stewart Sterk (1973), professor of law at the Benjamin N. Cardozo School of Law
 Richard Briffault (1974), professor of law at Columbia Law School
 David S. Katz (1974), professor of early modern European history at Tel Aviv University
 James R. Russell (1974), professor of Ancient Near Eastern studies at Harvard University
 Steven Simon (1974), Middle East expert and former executive director of International Institute for Strategic Studies-US; former senior director in the United States National Security Council
 Haruo Shirane (1974), professor of Japanese literature of Columbia University
 Jonathan Crary (1975), art critic, essayist, professor of art at Columbia University
Robert S. Levine (1975), professor of American literature at University of Maryland, College Park
 Alexander J. Motyl (1975), professor of political science at Rutgers University
 David Albert (1976), professor of philosophy at Columbia University
 Louis Putterman (1976), professor of economics at Brown University
 Thomas Alan Schwartz (1976), professor of history at Vanderbilt University
 Barry Bergdoll (1977), chief curator of Architecture and Design at the Museum of Modern Art
 M. Gregg Bloche (1977), professor at Georgetown University Law Center
 Franco Mormando (1977), historian of Italy, professor at Boston College
 James S. Shapiro (1977), Shakespearean authority
 Peter Christopher (1978), writer and professor at Georgia Southern University
Jorge Duany (1978), director of the Cuban Research Institute and professor of anthropology at Florida International University
Jay M. Harris (1978), professor of Jewish studies at Harvard University
 William D. Hartung (1978), director of the Arms & Security Project at the Center for International Policy
 Kevin Salatino (1978), curator at Art Institute of Chicago, former director of the Bowdoin College Museum of Art and Huntington Library's art collection
 Jeffry Frieden (1979), professor and department chair of political science at Harvard University
 Steve Fuller (1979), American philosopher, sociologist in the field of science and technology studies
 Alexander George (1979), professor of philosophy at Amherst College; founder of AskPhilosophers.org
 Timothy Gilfoyle (1979), professor of history at Loyola University Chicago
 Mark Statman (1980), professor emeritus of literary studies at Eugene Lang College of Liberal Arts
 Sahotra Sarkar (1981), professor of philosophy at the University of Texas at Austin
 Alan Tansman (1981), scholar of Japanese literature at University of California, Berkeley
 Michael Bérubé (1982), professor of literature and cultural studies
 David Makovsky (1982), Middle East Scholar
 Eugene Rogan (1982), professor and director of St Antony's College, Oxford's Middle East Centre
James L. Gelvin (1983), professor of history at University of California, Los Angeles
 Mark Ravina (1983), professor of Japanese history at the University of Texas at Austin
 Jonathan Zimmerman (1983), Professor of History of Education at the University of Pennsylvania Graduate School of Education
 Gideon Rosen (1984), professor of philosophy at Princeton University
 Jordan Sand (1984), professor Japanese history at Georgetown University
 Thomas Sugrue (1984), historian of the 20th century United States
 Jamsheed Choksy (1985), chair of Eurasian studies at Indiana University Bloomington
 Noam Elkies (1985), mathematician, youngest full professor at Harvard
 William Deresiewicz (1985), literary critic
 Louis Warren (1985), professor of Western U.S. history at the University of California, Davis
 Alexander Argüelles (1986), American polyglot and professor at the American University in the Emirates; son of poet Ivan Argüelles
 Tobias Hecht (1986), American anthropologist, ethnographer, and translator; winner of the 2002 Margaret Mead Award
 Alva Noë (1986), professor of philosophy at University of California, Berkeley
Anthony B. Pinn (1986), professor of religion at Rice University
 Ritu Birla (1987), historian of modern South Asia, director of University of Toronto's Asian Institute
Scott J. Shapiro (1987), professor of law and philosophy at Yale Law School, director of the Yale Center for Law and Philosophy
Irene Tucker (1987), literary critic, professor at University of California, Irvine
Katherine B. Crawford (1988), professor of gender studies and history at Vanderbilt University
Leslie M. Harris (1988), expert on African-American history at Northwestern University
Claudio Saunt (1989), professor at the University of Georgia, author of Unworthy Republic
Nicholas Birns (1988), Tolkien scholar
William H. Sherman (1988), director of the Warburg Institute, University of London
Stephanie Stebich (1988), director of Smithsonian American Art Museum
 Stephanos Bibas (1989), professor of law and criminology at the University of Pennsylvania Law School, judge for the United States Court of Appeals for the Third Circuit
 Karen Chapple (1989), scholar of Urban planning at University of California, Berkeley
Jesús Escobar (1989), professor of Art History at Northwestern University, expert in early modern art of Spain and Italy
 Daniel Halberstam (1989), professor of law at the University of Michigan Law School
Stephanie Aaronson (1990), American economist and vice president of Brookings Institution
 Rhea Anastas (1990), art historian, critic, curator and professor at University of California, Irvine
 Matthew Connelly (1990), professor of international and global history at Columbia University
 Juliet Koss (1990), art historian, professor at Scripps College
 Jennifer Lee (1990), sociologist, professor of Columbia University
 Catherine Prendergast (1990), professor of English at University of Illinois Urbana-Champaign
Benjamin Frommer (1991), American historian, professor at Northwestern University
 Mary Pattillo (1991), professor of African-American studies at Northwestern University
Cynthia A. Young (1991), professor of African-American studies at Pennsylvania State University
Robert T. Miller (1992), professor of law at the University of Iowa
Matthew Shum (1992), professor of economics at California Institute of Technology
Victor Fleischer (1993), professor of law at University of California, Irvine
 Valerie Purdie Greenaway (1993), professor of psychology and first African American to receive tenure in the sciences at Columbia University
 Michelle Hartman (1993), professor of Arabic and francophone literature at McGill University 
 Soyoung Lee (1993), chief curator of the Harvard Art Museums 
 Seth Rockman (1993), professor at Brown University, co-recipient of the 2010 Merle Curti Award 
 David Rosen (1993), professor at Trinity College, Connecticut, recipient of the 2013 James Russell Lowell Prize 
 David Eisenbach (1994), historian on media and politics; narrator, 10 Things You Don't Know About
 François Furstenberg (1994), historian at Johns Hopkins University
 Katerina Harvati (1994), professor of paleoanthropology at the University of Tübingen, identified the earliest known sample of the remains of modern humans outside Africa
Ayanna Thompson (1994), professor of English at Arizona State University, President of the Shakespeare Association of America
David H. Webber (1995), professor of law at Boston University School of Law
Barry Scott Wimpfheimer (1995), professor of religious studies at Northwestern University, expert on the Talmud
Lara Bazelon (1996), professor of law at University of San Francisco School of Law
 Gabriella Coleman (1996), American anthropologist known for her work in hacker culture and online activism; professor at McGill University
Elena Conis (1996), American historian of medicine at University of California, Berkeley
Leah DeVun (1997), professor of gender studies at Rutgers University
 Jessica Greenberg (1997), social anthropologist and professor at University of Illinois at Urbana–Champaign
 Lauren Winner (1997), historian, professor at Duke Divinity School
Brooke Holmes (1998), American classicist, professor at Princeton University
Alison Gass (1998), former chief curator of the Cantor Arts Center, director of the Smart Museum of Art and the Institute of Contemporary Art San José
 Louis Hyman (1999), economic historian, professor at Cornell University School of Industrial and Labor Relations, author of Debtor Nation
 Adrianne Wadewitz (1999), American feminist scholar and noted Wikipedian
 Yehuda Kurtzer (2000), president of the Shalom Hartman Institute, son of ambassador Daniel C. Kurtzer
Natalia Mehlman Petrzela (2000), professor of history at The New School
Fotini Christia (2001), Greek political scientist, professor at Massachusetts Institute of Technology
 Joya Powell (2001), Bessie Awards-winning choreographer and educator
 Agnia Grigas (2002), political scientist and author
 Cassie Mogilner Holmes (2002), professor at the UCLA Anderson School of Management
 Daniel Immerwahr (2002), professor of history of Northwestern University and recipient of the Merle Curti Award
 Jessica Chiccehitto Hindman (2003), professor at Northern Kentucky University, National Book Critics Circle Award finalist
 Rujeko Hockley (2005), curator of the Whitney Museum of American Art and the 2019 Whitney Biennial
 Susanna Berger (2007), art historian, professor at University of Southern California
Ashley James (2009), first black curator of the Solomon R. Guggenheim Museum

University presidents and administrators
 John M. Mason (1789), provost of Columbia College and president of Dickinson College
 Philip Milledoler (1793), fifth president of Rutgers University
 Nathaniel Fish Moore (1802), eighth President of Columbia University
 Isaac Ferris (1816), third President of New York University
 James Hall Mason Knox (1841), 8th president of Lafayette College
 John Aikman Stewart (1841), businessman, banker, acting president of Princeton University
John Howard Van Amringe (1860), mathematician and Dean of Columbia College
 Seth Low (1870), president of Columbia University and mayor of New York City
 Nicholas Murray Butler (1882), president of Columbia University, chairman of the Carnegie Endowment for International Peace and Nobel Peace Prize winner, founder of Horace Mann School and the College Board
 Francis Lister Hawks Pott (1883), Episcopal missionary and president of St. John's University, Shanghai from 1888 to 1941
Thomas Fiske (1885), professor of mathematics at Columbia University; acting dean of Barnard College; president of the American Mathematical Society from 1902 to 1904; secretary of the College Board
 Frank Pierrepont Graves (1890), former president of the University of Washington, University of Wyoming; Commissioner of Education of the State of New York from 1921 to 1940
 Frank D. Fackenthal (1906), acting president of Columbia University
 Dixon Ryan Fox (1911), Union College president from 1934 to 1945
Louis L. Kaplan (1922), acting chancellor of University of Maryland, Baltimore County and president of Baltimore Hebrew University
Frederick Burkhardt (1933), president emeritus of the American Council of Learned Societies and third president of Bennington College
 James S. Coles (1936), ninth president of Bowdoin College
William C. Fels (1937), fourth president of Bennington College
George James (1937), Commissioner of Health of the City of New York, dean of the Mount Sinai School of Medicine, president of Mount Sinai Health System
 James C. Fletcher (1940), president of the University of Utah and administrator of the National Aeronautics and Space Administration
 Herbert A. Deane (1942), political scientist, vice provost of Columbia University
 Martin Meyerson (1942), president of the University of Pennsylvania
 Henry S. Coleman (1946), acting dean of Columbia College, Columbia University during the Columbia University protests of 1968
Steven Marcus (1948), George Delacorte Professor in the Humanities and Dean of Columbia College
Carl Hovde (1950), professor of English and Dean of Columbia College following the Columbia University protests of 1968.
Rudolph H. Weingartner (1950), former provost of the University of Pittsburgh, former dean of the College of Arts and Sciences at Northwestern University
Ralph Lowenstein (1951), dean of the University of Florida College of Journalism and Communications
 Michael I. Sovern (1951), president of Columbia University
Richard N. Rosett (1953), dean of the University of Chicago Booth School of Business, Arts and Sciences at Washington University in St. Louis, and chairman of National Bureau of Economic Research
Robert L. Friedheim (1955), former director of the USC School of International Relations
 Calvin B. T. Lee (1955), former chancellor of University of Maryland, Baltimore County and acting president of Boston University
Robert E. Paaswell (1956), American civil engineer, former interim president of City College of New York and CEO of Chicago Transit Authority
Kenneth Gros Louis (1959), Chancellor of Indiana University system
Richard A. Merrill (1959), 7th dean of the University of Virginia School of Law
 Stephen Joel Trachtenberg (1959), president of the University of Hartford and of George Washington University
David C. Levy (1960), dean of the Parsons School of Design and president of the Corcoran Gallery of Art
Steven M. Cahn (1966), provost and acting president of Graduate Center of the City University of New York
 Dimitri B. Papadimitriou (1970), executive vice president and provost of Bard College
David Rubin (1970), American professor of communications and dean of S. I. Newhouse School of Public Communications
Alan Cooper (1971), provost of Jewish Theological Seminary of America, former member of Sha Na Na
William Germano (1972), dean of the faculty of humanities and social sciences at Cooper Union, former editor-in-chief of Columbia University Press
Saul Levmore (1973), commercial law scholar, former dean of the University of Chicago Law School
 Ronald Mason Jr. (1974), president of the University of the District of Columbia and former president of Southern University
 Reynold Verret (1976), president of Xavier University of Louisiana
Gregory F. Ball (1977), American psychologist, dean of the University of Maryland College of Behavioral and Social Sciences
Thomas Worcester (1977), American Jesuit academic, president of Regis College, Toronto, professor of the University of Toronto
Alan Kadish (1977), President of the Touro College and University System
Ralph Keen (1979), professor and dean of the honors college at the University of Illinois at Chicago
Colin Crawford (1980), 24th dean of the University of Louisville School of Law and incoming dean of the Golden Gate University School of Law
 Samuel Hoi (1980), president of the Maryland Institute College of Art
 Daniel Gordis (1981), vice president of Shalem College, Israel's first liberal arts college
 Mark C. Gordon (1981), first president and dean of the Mitchell Hamline School of Law, former president of Defiance College and dean of the University of Detroit Mercy School of Law
 Donald S. Siegel (1981), economist and director of the School of Public Affairs at Arizona State University 
 Deborah Waxman (1989), president of Reconstructionist Rabbinical College and Jewish Reconstructionist Communities
 Jonathan H. Earle (1990), dean of Roger Hadfield Ogden Honors College at Louisiana State University
Melissa Michelson (1990), dean of arts and sciences at Menlo College
Melanie Jacobs (1991), dean of the University of Louisville School of Law and Michigan State University College of Law
Ashish Jha (1992), dean of the Brown University School of Public Health and former professor of the Harvard T.H. Chan School of Public Health
Sarah Bunin Benor (1997), vice provost of Hebrew Union College – Jewish Institute of Religion, recipient of 2019 Sami Rohr Choice Award for Jewish Literature

Actors
 John B. Mason (1880), American stage actor
 Ralph Morgan (1904), co-founder of Actors Equity and first president of the Screen Actors Guild
 Nat Pendleton (1916), portrayer of Eugen Sandow in The Great Ziegfeld and silver-medal wrestler in the 1920 Summer Olympics
 James Cagney* (1922), winner of the Academy Award for his portrayal of George M. Cohan in Yankee Doodle Dandy
 Cornel Wilde* (1933), star of The Greatest Show on Earth, Beach Red, and Academy Award nominee for A Song to Remember
 Richard Ney (1940), actor, Mrs. Miniver; husband of Greer Garson
 Dolph Sweet (1948), played Carl Canisky in Gimme a Break!
 Sorrell Booke (1949), played Boss Hogg in The Dukes of Hazzard
 Stephen Strimpell (1954), star of Mister Terrific
 George Segal (1955), star of Who's Afraid of Virginia Woolf?, Ship of Fools and Just Shoot Me!, winner of the Golden Globe Award for New Star of the Year – Actor in 1965 Golden Globe Award for Best Actor – Motion Picture Musical or Comedy in 1973
 Brian Dennehy (1960), winner of the Tony Award and the Golden Globe Award for Best Actor – Miniseries or Television Film for Death of a Salesman
Don Briscoe (1962), American actor, Dark Shadows
Roger Davis (1962), American actor, Dark Shadows, Alias Smith and Jones
 William Finley (1963), film actor; co-star of Phantom of the Paradise
 Jared Martin (1965), actor, Dallas
 Ben Stein (1966), host of Win Ben Stein's Money; speechwriter for former US President Richard M. Nixon
 Gerrit Graham* (1970), film actor and songwriter
Ed Harris* (1973), Academy Award-nominated actor and director, Apollo 13, The Truman Show, Pollock, Westworld
 Richard Thomas* (1973), star of The Waltons
 Robert Wisdom (1976), actor, Nashville, The Wire, Prison Break
 Mario Van Peebles (1978), star of Heartbreak Ridge and Sonny Spoon
 Jack Koenig (1981), actor
 Matt Salinger (1983), actor son of J.D. Salinger
 Robert Maschio (1988), actor on Scrubs
 Matthew Fox (1989), star of Party of Five and Lost
 Soterios Johnson (1990), American radio journalist and WNYC host
 Schuyler Grant (1993), American actress, great-niece of Katharine Hepburn
 Rachel DeWoskin (1994), actress and author, Foreign Babes in Beijing
 Jean Louisa Kelly (1994), star of Mr. Holland's Opus
 Amanda Peet (1994), star of the TV series Jack & Jill and Studio 60 on the Sunset Strip, and the film The Whole Nine Yards
 Cara Buono (1995), star of Third Watch and Stranger Things
 Casey Affleck (1998), Golden Globe and Academy Award-nominated actor for The Assassination of Jesse James by the Coward Robert Ford, and actor in Good Will Hunting and Ocean's Eleven
 Maggie Gyllenhaal (1999), Golden Globe-winning actress for The Honourable Woman, and star in Secretary, Stranger than Fiction and The Dark Knight
 Ebon Moss-Bachrach (1999), actor, Girls
Liza Weil (1999), actress, The Gilmore Girls
Amir Arison (2000), actor in The Blacklist
 Charlotte Newhouse (2001), actress and producer of Comedy Central's Idiotsitter
 Jesse Bradford (2002), actor in Flags of Our Fathers and Bring It On
 Jake Gyllenhaal* (2002), Academy Award-nominated actor for Brokeback Mountain, star of Jarhead and Donnie Darko
 Brandon Victor Dixon (2003), Tony Award-nominated broadway actor starring in Scottsboro Boys
 Rachel Nichols (2003), actress, Continuum, G.I. Joe: The Rise of Cobra
 Jenny Slate (2004), cast member, Saturday Night Live
 Anna Paquin* (2004), winner of the Academy Award for The Piano
 Rider Strong (2004), star of Boy Meets World
 Julia Jones (2005), actress in The Twilight Saga and Westworld
 Julia Stiles (2005), star of Save the Last Dance and Mona Lisa Smile
 Kate McKinnon (2006), Emmy winning actress and comedian, Saturday Night Live
 Grace Parra (2006), actress, screenwriter, TV host
 Emmy Rossum* (2008), Golden Globe-nominated actress of The Phantom of the Opera and The Day After Tomorrow 
Hal Scardino (2008), child actor known for his role in The Indian in the Cupboard
 Jeremy Blackman (2009), appeared in Magnolia
 Max Minghella (2009), appeared in Syriana and Art School Confidential
 Spencer Treat Clark (2010), appeared in Gladiator, Mystic River, and Unbreakable
Asher Grodman (2010), actor, Ghosts
 Sarah Steele (2011), actress, Spanglish
 Remy Zaken (2012), actress on Spring Awakening
 Jin Ha (2013), actor, Love Life, Devs
 Devyn Tyler (2013), actress, Clarice and Snowfall
 Gabby Beans (2014), actress, Tony Award for Best Actress in a Play nominee
 Kelsey Chow (2014), actress, Pair of Kings
 Cinta Laura (2014), actress and singer
 Sofia Vassilieva (2014), actress, Eloise at the Plaza, Eloise at Christmastime
Marjana Chowdhury (2015), model, actress, philanthropist and beauty queen
 Hari Nef (2015), transgender model, actress, and writer; signed to IMG Models
 Ben Platt* (2016), actor and singer, Pitch Perfect, The Book of Mormon, Dear Evan Hansen, transferred to Columbia University School of General Studies
 Katie Chang* (2017), actress, The Bling Ring, A Birder's Guide to Everything
 Timothée Chalamet* (2017), Academy Award-nominated actor, Call Me by Your Name
 Sami Gayle (2018), actress, Blue Bloods, Candy Jar, Vampire Academy
 Kenny Ridwan (2021), actor, The Goldbergs
 Emily Robinson (2021), actress, The Orphans' Home Cycle, Eighth Grade
Kiera Allen (2022), actress, Run

Activists 

 Samuel Cutler Ward (1831), lobbyist known as the "King of the Lobby"
 Henry Bergh* (1834), founder of the American Society for the Prevention of Cruelty to Animals and the Massachusetts Society for the Prevention of Cruelty to Children
 Arthur B. Spingarn (1897), civil rights activist; elected president of the National Association for the Advancement of Colored People from 1940 to 1965; namesake of the Moorland–Spingarn Research Center at Howard University
 George Marshall (1926), political activist and conservationist
 John B. Trevor Jr. (1931), director and treasurer of the Pioneer Fund
 David Crook (1935), British-born Communist ideologue, activist, spy, husband of Isabel Crook, professor at Beijing Foreign Studies University
 Robert Gnaizda (1957), lawyer, activist, and co-founder of advocacy group Greenlining Institute
 Morris J. Amitay (1958), lobbyist, former executive director of the American Israel Public Affairs Committee and vice chairman of the Jewish Institute for National Security Affairs
 Richard Grossman (1965), critic and organizer against corporate power, former director of Greenpeace USA
Brian Flanagan (1968), former member of the Students for a Democratic Society and Weather Underground
 David Gilbert (1966), leader of Students for a Democratic Society and participant in the deadly 1981 Brink's robbery with Kathy Boudin, the mother of his child Chesa Boudin
 Ted Gold* (1968), student activist, leader of the Students for a Democratic Society and member of the Weatherman group who died in the 1970 Greenwich Village townhouse explosion
 John Jacobs (1969), student activist, member of Students for a Democratic Society and the Weather Underground, went into hiding after the fatal 1970 Greenwich Village townhouse explosion
 Mark Rudd (1969), president of Students for a Democratic Society and member of the Weather Underground
 Stephen Donaldson (1970), bisexual political activist, founder of the Student Homophile League at Columbia, the oldest college LGBTQ organization in the world
 David Kaczynski (1970), anti-death penalty activist, brother of Unabomber Theodore Kaczynski
 Robert Roth* (1970), American activist associated with the Students for a Democratic Society
 Sheena Wright (1990), CEO of the United Way of New York City
 David Kaiser (1991), American philanthropist, environmental activist, president of the Rockefeller Family Fund, great-great-grandson of John D. Rockefeller
 Benjamin Jealous (1994), president of the NAACP
 Ai-jen Poo (1996), activist, recipient of the MacArthur Fellowship in 2014
 Risë Wilson (1997), activist
 Anna Baltzer (2002), activist for Palestinian human rights
 Ady Barkan (2006), activist and organizer for Center for Popular Democracy
 Tourmaline (2006), activist and filmmaker 
 Emma Sulkowicz (2015), American performance activist known for Mattress Performance (Carry That Weight) and Ceci N'est Pas Un Viol
 Henry Williams (2022), political activist and chief of staff of the Mike Gravel 2020 presidential campaign

Artists and architects
 James Renwick Jr. (1836), Gothic Revival architect who designed St. Patrick's Cathedral, New York
 Charles C. Haight (1861), American architect who designed the old campus of Columbia University, numerous buildings at Yale University as well as the campus of General Theological Seminary
 Walter Satterlee (1863), American figure and genre painter
 Lockwood de Forest* (1872), American artist, interior and furniture designer
 Devereux Emmet (1883), pioneering golf course architect who designed the golf course at the Congressional Country Club
 Henry Martyn Congdon (1854), architect and designer
 William Ordway Partridge (1885), sculptor who built the statue of Thomas Jefferson at Columbia University, Kauffmann Memorial, and the statue of Pocahontas in Jamestown, Virginia
 Goodhue Livingston (1888), founder of the architectural firm Trowbridge & Livingston
 Henry Shrady (1894), sculptor known for the Ulysses S. Grant Memorial in Washington, D.C.
 Julian Clarence Levi (1896), architect, watercolorist, philanthropist 
Gilbert White (1900), American painter
Henry Rutgers Beekman (1903), American watercolorist
 Ely Jacques Kahn (1904), commercial architect who designed the Municipal Asphalt Plant, the Film Center Building, 120 Wall Street, 399 Park Avenue, One Penn Plaza, and 1095 Avenue of the Americas
 Rockwell Kent* (1907), illustrator
 Eric Gugler (1911), architect who designed the current Oval Office
Albert Mayer (1916), American planner who designed the master plan of Chandigarh
 Isamu Noguchi* (1926), sculptor, namesake of the Noguchi table and Noguchi Museum, designer of the Moerenuma Park, Bayfront Park, and the Lillie and Hugh Roy Cullen Sculpture Garden
 Charles Alston (1929), artist
 Ad Reinhardt (1935), Abstract Expressionist artist and critic
 Arthur Rothstein (1935), photographer for the Farm Security Administration and Look magazine
 Vincent Kling (1938), architect, co-founder of KlingStubbins
 Ed Rice (1940), American author, publisher, photojournalist and painter
 Charles Saxon (1940), cartoonist
 Burton Silverman (1949), painter 
 George S. Zimbel (1951), photographer
 Frederick C. Baldwin (1955), photographer
 Edward Koren (1957), cartoonist
 John Giorno (1958), artist, subject of Andy Warhol's first movie, Sleep
 Robert A. M. Stern (1960), traditionalist architect, dean of the Yale School of Architecture
 Scott Burton (1962), urban sculptor
 Bernard Cywinski (1962), architect and co-founder of the firm Bohlin Cywinski Jackson, which designed the Liberty Bell center in Philadelphia, the Apple Fifth Avenue store, and the Seattle City Hall
Stephen A. Lesser (1966), architect 
 Gordon Gahan (1967)*, photographer for National Geographic
 Edwin Schlossberg (1967), designer, author, artist; husband of Caroline Kennedy
 Francis Levy (1969), comic book artist
 Greg Wyatt (1971), sculptor-in-residence at the Cathedral of St. John the Divine, known for designing the Peace Fountain
 Timothy Greenfield-Sanders (1974), photographer and documentary filmmaker
 Michael Middleton Dwyer (1975), American architect known for his restoration works
 James Sanders (1976), architect who co-wrote New York: A Documentary Film with Ric Burns '78
 Ephraim Rubenstein (1978), artist 
 Peter Pennoyer (1980), architect known for the renovation of the Colony Club and the Knickerbocker Club, great-great grandson of J.P. Morgan
 John Arcudi (1983), cartoonist for DC Comics and creator of The Mask and Major Bummer
 Adam Van Doren (1984), American watercolorist
 Jacob Collins (1986), American realist painter, founder of the Grand Central Academy of Art
 Lance Hosey (1987), architect, author of The Shape of Green; Chief sustainability officer of the global architectural firm RTKL Associates
 Matthew Weinstein (1987), American visual artist, son of American physician I. Bernard Weinstein
 Christopher Payne (1990), photographer
 Peter Mendelsund (1991), creative director of The Atlantic, graphic designer
 Rachel Feinstein (1993), sculptor
 Alison Castle (1995), photographer and book editor, daughter of artist Wendell Castle
 Ricardo Cortés (1995), illustrator, It's Just a Plant
 Damon Winter (1997), Pulitzer Prize-winning photographer for The New York Times
 Damon Rich (1997), urban designer, 2017 MacArthur Fellow
 Nicola López (1998), American artist, professor at the Columbia University School of the Arts
 Emily Abruzzo (2000), co-founder of Abruzzo Bodziak Architects
Steffani Jemison (2003), American artist
 Ariel Schrag (2003), American cartoonist
Amanda Phingbodhipakkiya (2010), Thai-American artist known for the project Beyond Curie

Athletes

 John Cox Stevens (1803), founder and first commodore of the New York Yacht Club, won the first America's Cup trophy in 1851
 Reginald Sayre (1881), orthopedic surgeon and Olympic sport shooter
 Charles Sands (1887), American athlete who won the gold medal in Golf at the 1900 Summer Olympics
 Oliver Campbell (1891), American tennis player; youngest male winner of the US Open Singles title from 1890 to 1990
 Charles Townsend (1893), first Olympic fencer from the Ivy League; silver medalist in the 1904 Summer Olympics
 Gustavus Town Kirby (1895), president of the United States Olympic Committee from 1920 to 1924, and Amateur Athletic Union from 1911 to 1913
 Leo Fishel (1899), first Jewish pitcher in Major League Baseball
 Harold Weekes (1903), football player for the Columbia Lions, member of the College Football Hall of Fame
 Harry A. Fisher (1905), basketball coach for Columbia, United States Military Academy, St. John's; member of the Basketball Hall of Fame
 Robert LeRoy (1905), two-time silver medalist in the 1904 Summer Olympics
 Eddie Collins (1907), baseball player for the Chicago White Sox and member of the Baseball Hall of Fame
 Marcus Hurley (1908), cyclist who won four gold medals in Cycling at the 1904 Summer Olympics
 Jay Gould II* (1911), American real tennis player, Olympic gold medalist in 1908 and world champion from 1914 to 1916; great-grandson of financier Jay Gould
 Ted Kiendl (1911), National Basketball Player of the Year in 1911; corporate lawyer, argued Erie Railroad Co. v. Tompkins before the Supreme Court in 1938
 George Smith (1916), pitcher for the Philadelphia Phillies
 Millard Bloomer (1920), Olympic fencer
 Harold Bloomer (1924), Olympic fencer
 Lou Gehrig* (1925), first baseman for the New York Yankees and member of the Baseball Hall of Fame
 Walter Koppisch (1925), football player for the New York Giants, member of the College Football Hall of Fame
 Ralph Furey (1928), football player, athletic director of Columbia University from 1943 to 1968
 Art Smith (1928), baseball player for the Chicago White Sox
 Fresco Thompson (1928), baseball player for the Philadelphia Phillies
 Hugh Alessandroni (1929), Olympic bronze medalist fencer
 Norman Armitage (1931), Olympic bronze medalist fencer; first person to be inducted into the USFA Hall of Fame
 Lou Bender (1932), pioneer player with the Columbia Lions and in early pro basketball; later a successful trial attorney
 George Gregory Jr. (1933), first African American basketball player to be selected as All-American
Alfred Skrobisch (1933), Olympic fencer
 Cliff Montgomery (1934), led the Columbia Lions football team to victory in the Rose Bowl
 John O'Brien (1938), basketball player for the Akron Wingfoots
 Ben Johnson (1938), American sprinter who rivaled Jesse Owens
 Sid Luckman (1939), NFL Hall of Fame Chicago Bears quarterback
Ken Germann (1943), football coach, athletic director of Columbia University, and former Southern Conference commissioner 
 Paul Governali (1943), football player for the Boston Yanks and New York Giants
 Walt Budko (1948), basketball player for Baltimore Bullets and Philadelphia Warriors
 Bruce Gehrke (1948), football player for New York Giants
 Bill Swiacki (1948), player for New York Giants, member of the College Football Hall of Fame
 Lou Kusserow (1949), football player for Hamilton Tiger-Cats and New York Yanks
 John Azary (1951), basketball player, recipient of the Haggerty Award
 Jack Molinas (1953), NBA player for the Fort Wayne Pistons
 Jack Rohan (1953), head coach of the Columbia Lions men's basketball team from 1961 to 1974, and 1990 to 1995
George Shaw (1953), American Olympic triple jumper 
 Richard Ballantine* (1967), cyclist and cycling advocate; son of Ian Ballantine '38 of Ballantine Books
 James Margolis (1958), Olympic fencer
 James Melcher (1961), Olympian fencer, president of Fencers Club and hedge fund manager
 Robert Contiguglia (1963), soccer player, former president of the United States Soccer Federation
 Peter Salzberg (1964), head coach of Vermont Catamounts men's basketball from 1972 to 1981
 Archie Roberts (1965), former football player for the Miami Dolphins and cardiac surgeon
 Jim McMillian (1968), NBA player for the Los Angeles Lakers, Buffalo Braves, New York Knicks and Portland Trail Blazers
 Dave Newmark (1968), NBA player for the Chicago Bulls; also played for Israeli team Hapoel Tel Aviv B.C.
 Marty Domres (1969), football player for San Diego Chargers and Baltimore Colts
 Heyward Dotson (1970), basketball player
 George Starke (1971), offensive lineman for the Washington Redskins
 Henry Bunis (1975), two-time All-American tennis player, runner-up in 1977 Chilean Open
 Rick Fagel (1975), professional tennis player
 Vitas Gerulaitis* (1975), champion tennis player
Thomas Losonczy (1975), American Olympic fencer, winner of the Congressional Gold Medal
 Alton Byrd (1979), basketball player
 Eric Fromm (1980), tennis player
 John Witkowski (1983), football player for Detroit Lions and Houston Oilers
 Gene Larkin (1984), member of the Minnesota Twins 1987 and 1991 World Series championship teams
 Amr Aly (1985), soccer player who won the Hermann Trophy as the top college player of the year 1984; member of the 1984 U.S. Olympic Soccer Team and indoor soccer team Los Angeles Lazers
 Stephen Trevor (1986), Olympic fencer
 Kyra Tirana Barry (1987), team leader for U.S. Women's National wrestling team
 Caitlin Bilodeaux (1987), Olympic fencer
Howard Endelman (1987), American tennis player
 Phil Williamson (1987), tennis player for Antigua and Barbuda
 Bob Cottingham (1988), Olympic fencer
 Jon Normile (1989), Olympic fencer
 Frank Seminara (1989), Major League Baseball pitcher for the San Diego Padres and the New York Mets
Tom Auth (1990), Olympic rower
 Christine Vardaros (1991), professional cyclist
 Ann Marsh (1994), Olympic fencer
 Ríkharður Daðason (1996), Icelandic soccer player
 Marcellus Wiley (1997), football player for the Buffalo Bills, San Diego Chargers and Dallas Cowboys
 Dan Kellner (1998), fencer
Pellegrino Matarazzo (1999), head coach of VfB Stuttgart
Matt Napoleon (1999), Olympic soccer goalkeeper
 Cristina Teuscher (2000), Olympic gold medalist swimmer
 Jedediah Dupree (2001), NCAA Champion fencer
 Veljko Urošević (2003), Serbian Olympic rower
 Fernando Perez (2004), Outfielder for the Tampa Bay Rays
 Jeremiah Boswell (2005), professional basketball player for BC Sliven, KK Strumica, and KK Torus
 Delilah DiCrescenzo (2005), American long-distance runner, inspiration and subject of the Grammy-nominated song Hey There Delilah
 Michael Quarshie (2005), Finnish American football player who played for the Oakland Raiders and Frankfurt Galaxy
 Lisa Nemec (2006), Croatian long-distance runner
 Miloš Tomić (2006), Serbian Olympic rower
 Erison Hurtault (2007), Dominican sprinter
 James Leighman Williams (2007), American fencer who won silver in the 2008 Summer Olympics
Emily Jacobson (2008), fencer
 İhsan Emre Vural (2008), Turkish rower for Galatasaray S.K.
 Sherif Farrag (2009), Egyptian-American Olympic fencer
 Nicholas la Cava (2009), Olympic rower
 Jeff Spear (2010), Olympic fencer
 Daria Schneider (2010), fencer
 Jeff Adams (2011), Houston Texans offensive tackle
 Nicole Ross (2011), Olympic fencer
 Isadora Cerullo (2013), Brazilian-American Olympic rugby player
 Katie Meili (2013), Olympic swimmer, Pan American Games and 2016 Summer Olympics gold medalist
 Josh Martin (2013), Kansas City Chiefs linebacker
John Gregorek Jr. (2014), American middle-distance runner
 David Najem (2014), American soccer player for New Mexico United and the Afghanistan national football team
 Nadia Eke (2015), Ghanaian triple jumper, African Championships gold medalist in 2016
 Kristine Musademba (2015), American figure skater
 Max Schnur (2015), tennis player playing on the ATP Challenger Tour
 Nzingha Prescod (2015), Olympic fencer
 Ramit Tandon (2015), professional squash player
Jakub Buczek (2016), Canadian Olympic rower
 Sasha DiGiulian (2016), world champion climber
Jacqueline Dubrovich (2016), Olympic fencer
 Maodo Lô (2016), German basketball player for Brose Bamberg
Robb Paller (2016), American-Israeli Olympic baseball player
 Jeff Coby (2017), American basketball player for Xuventude Baloncesto
Cameron Nizialek (2017), football player for Atlanta Falcons
 Akua Obeng-Akrofi (2018), Ghanaian sprinter
Charlotte Buck (2018), Olympic rower
 Osama Khalifa (2018), #1 ranked college squash player in the United States for the 2016–2017 season
 Camille Zimmerman (2018), American basketball player for Norrköping Dolphins
Yasmeen Al-Dabbagh (2019), Saudi Arabian sprinter
 Jessica Antiles (2019), American swimmer who won silver and bronze medals in the 2017 Maccabiah Games
 Dylan Castanheira (2019), American soccer player, goalkeeper for Fort Lauderdale CF
Mike Smith (2020), American basketball player
 Anthony Jackie Tang (2020), Hong Kong tennis player
 John Tanguay (2020), American rower who won a silver medal in the 2020 Summer Paralympics
 Dylan Geick* (2021), American wrestler and internet personality
 Velavan Senthilkumar (2021), British Junior Open Squash champion and Asian Junior Squash champion
 Nastasya Generalova (2023), American gymnast and model
 Olivia Giaccio (2024), Olympic freestyle skier
Evita Griskenas (2024), American Rhythmic gymnast

Businesspeople
 Henry Rutgers (1766), Revolutionary War hero, businessman, philanthropist, and namesake of Rutgers University
 Leffert Lefferts (1794), first president of Long Island Bank
 William Bard (1798), son of physician Samuel Bard, founder and first president of New York Life Insurance Company
 Stephen Price (1799), theatrical manager who managed Park Theatre in Manhattan and Theatre Royal, Drury Lane in London
 William Backhouse Astor Sr.* (1811), son of John Jacob Astor
 Cornelius Roosevelt* (attended, year unknown), member of the Roosevelt family, one of the founders of the Chemical Bank; great-grandfather of Theodore Roosevelt
 James H. Roosevelt (1819), founder of Roosevelt Hospital
Robert Goelet Sr. (1828), American banker and real estate developer who was associated with the founding of the Chemical Bank
 Bradish Johnson (1831), American industrialist involved in the Swill milk scandal
 Robert L. Cutting (1830), co-founder of the Continental Bank of New York and president of the New York Stock Exchange
 Henry T. Anthony (1832), photographer, vice-president of the E. & H. T. Anthony & Company
 Adrian G Iselin* (1837), financier, banker
 Edward Anthony (1838), photographer and founder of E. & H. T. Anthony & Company, largest manufacturer and distributor of photographic supplies in the United States during the 19th century
 John Jacob Astor III (1839), son of William Backhouse Astor Sr.
 William Henry Vanderbilt* (1841), eldest son of Cornelius Vanderbilt; president of the New York Central Railroad, Lake Shore and Michigan Southern Railway, Canada Southern Railway, and Michigan Central Railroad
 Robert Morrison Olyphant (1842), heir to trading company Olyphant & Co. and president of the Delaware and Hudson Railway
 Charles Carow* (1844), businessman son of shipping magnate Isaac Carow, father of first lady Edith Carow Roosevelt
 Frederic W. Rhinelander (1847), 3rd president of the Metropolitan Museum of Art
 William Backhouse Astor Jr. (1849), son of William Backhouse Astor Sr. and husband of Caroline Webster Schermerhorn Astor, co-founder of The Four Hundred list of socialites and Florida Yacht Club
Robert L. Cutting Jr. (1856), American banker and clubman, son of Robert L. Cutting '30
George Lovett Kingsland (1856), American merchant and railroad executive, son of New York City mayor Ambrose Kingsland
Goold H. Redmond (1857), American banker and sportsman
Charles Henry Marshall (1858), American businessman, former Commissioner of Docks and Ferries of the City of New York, grandfather of publisher Marshall Field IV
John Crosby Brown (1859), heir to investment bank Brown Bros. & Co., which later became Brown Brothers Harriman & Co., the oldest private bank in the United States
 Emory McClintock (1859), actuary; president of the American Mathematical Society and the Actuarial Society of America
 Robert Goelet (1860), real estate developer
Rutherfurd Stuyvesant (1863), American socialite, heir to the Stuyvesant family fortune
J. Hooker Hamersley (1865), American heir, lawyer, and poet; former president of the Knickerbocker Club
Shipley Jones (1868), American banker and clubman
 William Bayard Cutting (1869), financier, philanthropist, namesake of the Bayard Cutting Arboretum State Park
 Robert Fulton Cutting (1871), American financier 
 George Beach de Forest Jr. (1871), American capitalist, bibliophile, and art collector
 Stuyvesant Fish (1871), president of the Illinois Central Railroad
 James Montaudevert Waterbury Sr. (1873), industrialist, co-founder of the New York Yacht Club
 Isaac Newton Seligman (1876), heir to American investment bank J. & W. Seligman & Co.
T. J. Oakley Rhinelander (1878), American heir and real estate developer who owned the Schönburg castle in Germany
 William Fellowes Morgan Sr. (1880), businessman, philanthropist
 George Henry Warren II (1880), stockbroker and real estate developer who co-founded the Metropolitan Opera and Real Estate Company
Eugene Higgins (1882), American heir and philanthropist
Lewis Morris Rutherfurd Jr. (1882), American socialite and sportsman
Marshall Orme Wilson (1882), banker and socialite, son-in-law of William Backhouse Astor Jr.
 George M. La Monte* (1884), chairman of Prudential Financial from 1925 to 1927
 Joseph P. Knapp* (1884), businessman, philanthropist, founder of Ducks Unlimited
 Temple Bowdoin (1885), former executive of J.P. Morgan & Co.
Benjamin Guggenheim* (1887), American businessman, son of Meyer Guggenheim and member of the Guggenheim family
Richard Thornton Wilson Jr. (1887), banker, prominent figure in Thoroughbred horse racing
Richard Stevens (1890), attorney and real estate developer in Hoboken, New Jersey, grandson of inventor John Stevens and son of Stevens Institute of Technology founder Edwin Augustus Stevens
 Cortlandt F. Bishop (1891), American aviator and book collector, grandson of philanthropist Benjamin Hazard Field
 Howard Gould* (1894), financier, son of railroad tycoon Jay Gould
 Joseph Peter Grace Sr. (1894), businessman, polo player, heir to W. R. Grace and Company; founder of Pan American-Grace Airways and Grace National Bank
Samuel Bloomingdale (1895), businessman, heir to the Bloomingdale's department store fortune
 Dexter M. Ferry Jr. (1898), director of D.M. Ferry & Co.; member of the Michigan House of Representatives
 Charles A. Dana (1902), philanthropist who founded the Dana Foundation and Dana Holding Corporation
 John Knowles Fitch (1902), founder of Fitch Ratings, one of the Big Three rating agencies
 Marcellus Hartley Dodge Sr. (1903), chairman of the Remington Arms Company, husband of Geraldine Rockefeller Dodge
George Earle Warren (1903), Vice President of Chase Manhattan Bank
Pendleton Dudley (1906), public relations executive, founder of Dudley-Anderson-Yutzy
 William Gage Brady Jr. (1908), Chairman of Citigroup from 1948 to 1952
 Edmond Guggenheim (1908), American mining executive, grandson of Meyer Guggenheim
 Ward Melville (1909), founder of the Melville Corporation that owned CVS Health, Marshalls, and Thom McAn shoes; helped the establishment of Stony Brook University and Stony Brook Village Center
John Vernou Bouvier III* (1914), American stockbroker and socialite, father of Jacqueline Kennedy Onassis, transferred to Yale College after two years
Armand G. Erpf (1917), senior partner at Loeb, Rhoades & Co., chairman of the Crowell-Collier Publishing Company, financial architect of the New York magazine
Alan H. Kempner (1917), American stockbroker and publishing executive, son-in-law of banker Carl M. Loeb
Lindsley F. Kimball (1917), former president of United Service Organizations and National Urban League 
Charles Bierer Wrightsman (1918), American oil executive and art collector 
 Armand Hammer (1919), philanthropist, chairman of Occidental Petroleum, namesake of Hammer Museum and Armand Hammer United World College of the American West
 George E. Jonas (1919), partner in Pellessier-Jonas-Rivet Manufacturing Co., philanthropist and founder of Camp Rising Sun
 S. Marshall Kempner (1919), American investment banker, and brother-in-law of Peggy Guggenheim
 John S. Sinclair (1920), fourth president of the Federal Reserve Bank of Philadelphia, former president of The Conference Board
Charles M. Brinckerhoff (1922), former CEO and chairman of Anaconda Copper, world's largest producer of copper
 Morris Schapiro (1923), American investment banker, grandfather of painter Jacob Collins '86 and brother of art historian Meyer Schapiro '24
 Lawrence Wien (1925), real estate magnate and philanthropist who owns the Empire State Building
Francis Levien (1926), lawyer, director of Gulf and Western Industries, namesake of Levien Gymnasium
 Herbert Hutner (1928), private investment banker, attorney, and philanthropist; fourth husband of socialite Zsa Zsa Gabor
 Ivan Veit (1928), former executive vice president of The New York Times
 Nathan S. Ancell (1929), co-founder of furniture company Ethan Allen
 Ira D. Wallach (1929), head of Central National-Gottesman, the largest privately held marketer of paper and pulp products
 Benedict I. Lubell (1930), American oilman, philanthropist
 Arthur Ross (1931), philanthropist, businessman; vice president of Central National-Gottesman; namesake of Arthur Ross Pinetum in Central Park
 Henry G. Walter Jr. (1931), businessman, former chairman and CEO of International Flavors & Fragrances and pioneer in aromatherapy
Robert D. Lilley (1933), former president of AT&T from 1972 to 1976 and the New Jersey Bell Telephone Company from 1965 to 1970
Macrae Sykes (1933), investment banker, former chairman of the American Stock Exchange
Robert David Lion Gardiner (1934), banker, landowner, 16th Lord of the manor of Gardiners Island, direct descendant of 17th century English settler Lion Gardiner
 Arnold A. Saltzman (1936), businessman, diplomat, art collector, philanthropist
 George J. Ames (1937), philanthropist, banker at Lazard Freres
 John Kluge (1937), billionaire, chairman and founder of Metromedia; America's richest person from 1989 to 1990; namesake of the John W. Kluge Center and Kluge Prize at the Library of Congress
 Vincent Sardi Jr.* (1937), American restaurateur, owner of Sardi's, son of Vincent Sardi, Sr.
 Fred D. Thompson (1937), president and chief executive of Family Circle, vice president of The New York Times
 Grover Connell (1939), American rice trader known for political campaign contributions
 Howard Pack (1939), chairman and president of Seatrain Lines
 Daniel Edelman (1940), founder of the world's largest public relations firm Edelman
 Elliott Sanger (1943), co-founder of classical radio channel WQXR-FM and advocate of FM broadcasting
Wylie F. L. Tuttle (1944), American real estate developer who spearheaded the construction of Tour Montparnasse
 Robert Rosencrans (1949), founding chairman of C-SPAN and president of UA-Columbia Cablevision
 Norton Garfinkle (1951), economist, businessman, public servant; chairman of the Future of American Democracy Foundation
Mark N. Kaplan (1951), CEO of Drexel Burnham Lambert and Engelhard
 Harvey M. Krueger (1951), CEO of Kuhn, Loeb & Co. and vice chairman of Lehman Brothers
 Alan Wagner (1951), first president of Disney Channel
 Roone Arledge (1952), former president of ABC News and winner of 36 Emmys; creator of 20/20, Nightline, Monday Night Football, ABC World News Tonight and Primetime
 Alan N. Cohen (1952), former co-owner of the Boston Celtics and the Brooklyn Nets; former chairman and CEO of the Madison Square Garden Corporation
Lawrence K. Grossman (1952), president of PBS from 1976 to 1984 and NBC News from 1985 to 1988
Richard Wald (1952), former president of NBC News from 1973 to 1977
Robert A. Belfer (1955), American oilman and philanthropist, namesake of the Belfer Center for Science and International Affairs at Harvard University
Thomas Ludlow Chrystie II (1955), first Chief Financial Officer of Merrill Lynch & Company and creator of the Cash Management Account
Alfred Lerner (1955), chairman of MBNA Bank and ex-owner of the Cleveland Browns
Richard Ravitch (1955), chairman of the Metropolitan Transportation Authority and the Bowery Savings Bank
 Sid Sheinberg (1955), head of Universal Pictures
Barry F. Sullivan (1955), chairman and CEO of First Chicago Bank, deputy mayor of New York City under David Dinkins
Edward Botwinick (1956), IT entrepreneur and inventor, co-founder of Timeplex
 Franklin A. Thomas (1956), former president of The Ford Foundation
 James R. Barker (1957), Chairman of Interlake Steamship Company, former Chairman and CEO of Moore-McCormack
Peter L. Buttenwieser (1958), American educator, Democratic Party fundraiser, member of the Lehman family
 Allen Rosenshine (1959), founder of the Omnicom Group, chairman and CEO of BBDO
 Doug Morris (1960), CEO of Sony Music Entertainment and former CEO of Universal Music Group
 Bernard Selz (1960), fund manager, philanthropist and anti-vaccination supporter
 Frank Lorenzo (1961), former chairman of Eastern Airlines, Texas Air Corporation and Texas International Airlines
 Douglas H. McCorkindale (1961), former chairman and CEO of Gannett
 William Campbell (1962), chairman of the board of Intuit, former board director of Apple Inc.; founder of Claris
Sanford Greenberg (1962), American investor, author and philanthropist
 Kenneth Lipper (1962), financier and deputy mayor of New York City; Academy Award-winning producer of The Holocaust documentary The Last Days
 Jerry Speyer (1962), billionaire, founding partner, chairman and CEO of Tishman Speyer and chairman of the Museum of Modern Art
 Robert Kraft (1963), chairman and CEO of The Kraft Group; owner of the New England Patriots
 Mark H. Willes (1963), former president of the Federal Reserve Bank of Minneapolis, CEO and Publisher of Los Angeles Times and Deseret Management Corporation
 Harry Saal (1963), co-founder of Network General Corporation, developer of the Sniffer
 Steven Clifford (1964), former CEO of King Broadcasting Company and National Mobile Television
 Arthur Cutler (1965), restaurateur, founder of Carmine's, Ollie's, and owner of Murray's Sturgeon Shop
 Ed Goodgold (1965), music industry executive and former manager of Sha Na Na, coined the term "trivia"
 Michael Gould (1966), former CEO of Bloomingdale's
 Julian Geiger (1967), former CEO of Aéropostale and current CEO of Crumbs Bake Shop
 Richard Sackler (1967), billionaire chairman and president of Purdue Pharma known for the development of Oxycontin
Denny Greene (1971), former executive at Columbia Pictures, professor at University of Dayton School of Law, and member of Sha Na Na
 Mark E. Kingdon (1971), hedge fund manager, president of Kingdon Capital Management
 Philip L. Milstein (1971), former chairman and CEO of Emigrant Savings Bank, son of billionaire real estate developer Seymour Milstein
 Christopher M. Jeffries (1972), American real estate developer, former husband of Princess Yasmin Aga Khan
 Marc Porat (1972), entrepreneur in information technology and sustainable materials; co-founder of General Magic
 John R. Eckel Jr. (1973), founder, CEO and chairman of Copano Energy
 Finbarr O'Neill (1973), former CEO of J.D. Power
 Fred Seibert (1973), TV producer and first creative director of MTV
 Robert B. Simon (1973), art dealer and historian who discovered Da Vinci's Salvator Mundi
 Albie Hecht (1974), founder of Spike TV, head of HLN, and former president of Nickelodeon; creator of Nickelodeon Kids' Choice Awards; Academy Award-nominated producer
 Alan Goodman (1974), MTV founding executive and Nickelodeon executive
 Gara LaMarche (1976), former president and CEO of The Atlantic Philanthropies; president of advocacy group Democracy Alliance
 J. Ezra Merkin (1976), American financier, hedge fund manager; former chairman of GMAC Inc.
 John Slosar (1978), chairman of Swire Pacific and Cathay Pacific airlines
Daniel E. Straus (1978), founder of CareOne LLC and former vice chairman of Memphis Grizzlies
Jeph Loeb (1979), television writer and EVP of Marvel Television, four-time Eisner Award winner
Sami Mnaymneh (1981), American billionaire, private equity executive, co-founder of H.I.G. Capital
Charles Murphy (1981), hedge fund manager, executive of Fairfield Greenwich Group
 Tom Glocer (1981), former CEO of Thomson Reuters and Reuters
 Christopher Radko (1981), businessman and designer, founder of the eponymous Christmas ornaments company
 Donald F. Ferguson (1982), Chief technology officer at Dell and Professor of Professional Practice in Computer Science at Columbia University
 Wayne Allyn Root (1983), business mogul, TV personality and producer, author, 2008 Libertarian Party vice-presidential nominee
 Daniel S. Loeb (1983), billionaire, hedge fund manager, founder of Third Point Management
 Kai-Fu Lee (1983), Taiwanese IT Venture Capitalist, founder of Google China and Microsoft Research Asia
 Steve Perlman (1983), founder and CEO of Artemis Networks; inventor of QuickTime, MSN TV, pCell, and Mova Contour facial motion capture technology
 Jonathan Abbott (1984), president and CEO of WGBH Educational Foundation
 Randy Lerner (1984), billionaire, ex-owner of Cleveland Browns and Aston Villa F.C., son of billionaire Alfred Lerner '55
James Satloff (1984), founder of Liberty Skis and former president and CEO of C.E. Unterberg, Towbin
Mehmet Omer Koç (1985), Turkish billionaire and member of the prominent Koç family of Turkey; son of billionaire Rahmi Koç and grandson of Vehbi Koç; chairman of Koç Holding, Turkey's largest conglomerate
 Nikolas Tsakos (1985), Greek shipping magnate, former chairman of the International Association of Independent Tanker Owners and husband of Greek fashion designer Celia Kritharioti
 Noam Gottesman (1986), billionaire, hedge fund manager, and co-founder of GLG Partners
 Daniel Ninivaggi (1986), CEO of Lordstown Motors and Chairman of Garrett Motion, former CEO of Federal-Mogul and CEO of Icahn Enterprises
 Alex Navab (1987), head of the Americas Private Equity Business of Kohlberg Kravis Roberts
 Ben Horowitz (1988), technology entrepreneur, co-founder of software company Opsware and venture capital firm Andreessen Horowitz, son of conservative writer David Horowitz '59
 Dirk Edward Ziff (1988), billionaire businessman, son of publishing magnate William Bernard Ziff Jr.
 Jonathan Lavine (1988), business executive, co-managing partner of Bain Capital and chief investment officer of Bain Capital Credit
 Anita Lo (1988), celebrity chef and restaurateur
 Danielle Maged (1989), Fox Networks Group executive
 Joanne Ooi (1989), former creative director of Shanghai Tang; CEO of Clean Air Network and Plukka
 Paul Greenberg (1990), former CEO of CollegeHumor and current CEO of Nylon
 Prem Parameswaran (1990), CFO of Eros International Plc and member of the President's Advisory Commission on Asian Americans and Pacific Islanders
William von Mueffling (1990), hedge fund manager, President of Cantillon Capital Management
 Christoph Westphal (1990), American biomedical entrepreneur, founder of Alnylam Pharmaceuticals, Acceleron Pharma, and OvaScience
 Marko Ahtisaari (1991), Finnish entrepreneur; founding CEO of Dopplr; son of Martti Ahtisaari, tenth President of Finland and Nobel Peace Prize laureate
Claude Arpels (1991), investor, entrepreneur, grandson of Julien Arpels and heir to the Van Cleef & Arpels fortune
 Tewodros Ashenafi (1991), founder and CEO of Ethiopian company SouthWest Energy
 Jack Hidary (1991), financier and entrepreneur, co-founder of the Automotive X Prize and EarthWeb/Dice Inc.
 E. Javier Loya (1991), CEO of OTC Global Holdings and minority owner in Houston Texans
 Zia Chishti (1992), American entrepreneur and founder of Afiniti and Align Technology
 Erik Feig (1992), Lionsgate co-president and former president of Summit Entertainment; producer of Step Up series, Escape Plan, Mr. & Mrs. Smith
Eugene Kashper (1992), owner of Pabst Brewing Company
 Rob Speyer (1992), president of Tishman Speyer, son of billionaire Jerry Speyer '62
 Thad Sheely (1993), former COO of Atlanta Hawks
 Shawn Landres (1994), social entrepreneur, co-founder of Jewish philanthropic organization Jumpstart
 Welly Yang (1994), real estate developer; former actor and playwright
 Ann Kim (1995), James Beard Foundation Award-winning restaurateur in Minneapolis
Matt Pincus (1995), founder of Songs Music Publishing, son of Warburg Pincus co-founder Lionel Pincus
 Arnold Kim (1996), founder of MacRumors
 Daniel M. Ziff (1996), third youngest billionaire hedge fund manager in the U.S., son of publishing magnate William Bernard Ziff Jr.
 Li Lu (1996), former student leader of the Tiananmen Square protests of 1989, and American investment banker, founder of Himalaya Capital
Michelle Patron (1996), director of sustainability at Microsoft
 Scott Sartiano (1997), American restauranter
 Roo Rogers (1998), entrepreneur, business designer, writer, son of British architect Richard Rogers
 Amol Sarva (1998), founder of Knotel, Peek, and Virgin Mobile USA
Amanda Steinberg (1999), American wealth advisor and founder of DailyWorth
 Shazi Visram (1999), founder of Happy Family
Peter Kujawski (2000), Chairman of Focus Features
Robert Reffkin (2000), co-founder and CEO of Compass, Inc.
Zvi Mowshowitz (2001), founder of MetaMed and former Magic: The Gathering world champion
 Daryl Ng (2001), executive director of Sino Group, son of Singaporean real estate billionaire Robert Ng
 Courtney Reum (2001), American investor who founded VeeV spirits
 Adriana Cisneros (2002), Vice Chairman and CEO of Grupo Cisneros; daughter of Venezuelan media mogul Gustavo Cisneros
 Ellen Gustafson (2002), businesswoman, social entrepreneur, food activist, co-founder of FEED Projects and former spokesperson for the World Food Programme
Peter Koechley (2003), co-founder of Upworthy and former managing editor of The Onion
 Aaron Bay-Schuck (2003), CEO and co-chairman of Warner Records, stepson of Star Trek actor Leonard Nimoy
 Carter Reum (2003), American author and entrepreneur, founder of VEEV Spirits and known for his romance with socialite Paris Hilton
 Anna Fang (2004), Chinese investor, CEO of ZhenFund
 Jamie Hodari (2004), co-founder of Industrious
 Alicia Yoon (2004), founder of Peach and Lily, a Korean skincare store based in New York
 Doug Imbruce (2005), founder of Qwiki and Podz
John Kluge Jr. (2005), American philanthropist, investor, activist, son of John Kluge '37
Alana Mayo (2006), president of Orion Pictures
 Liesel Pritzker Simmons (2006), former child actress, A Little Princess; granddaughter of businessman Abram Nicholas Pritzker, heiress to the Hyatt hotels fortune, philanthropist
 Wayne Ting (2006), CEO of Lime
Marco Zappacosta (2007), co-founder and CEO of Thumbtack, son of Logitech founder Pierluigi Zappacosta
 Adam Pritzker (2008), co-founder of General Assembly, grandson of Jay Pritzker
 Jared Hecht (2009), co-founder of GroupMe
 Ariana Rockefeller (2009), American fashion designer and great-great-granddaughter of John D. Rockefeller
Zach Sims* (2012), co-founder of Codecademy
Beverly Leon (2014), former midfielder of Sunderland A.F.C. Ladies, CEO of Local Civics
Nicole LaPointe Jameson (2016), CEO of Evil Geniuses
Jonah Reider (2016), chef, founder of the supper club Pith
 Korawad Chearavanont* (2017), Thai internet entrepreneur and grandson of Dhanin Chearavanont

Journalism and media figures

Arts critics
 Gustav Kobbé (1877), opera scholar and music critic of the New York Herald
 Clifton Fadiman (1925), book critic for The New Yorker and judge for the Book of the Month Club
Edward Downes (1933), music critic, former host on the Metropolitan Opera radio broadcasts, son of music critic Olin Downes
Ralph J. Gleason (1938), music critic for the San Francisco Chronicle and co-founder of Rolling Stone
 Eugene Williams (1938), jazz critic, founder of Jazz Information
 Allan Temko (1947), architecture critic of the San Francisco Chronicle and winner of the Pulitzer Prize for Criticism
 Andrew Sarris (1951), film critic
 Martin Gottfried (1955), critic, author, and biographer
 Donald Kuspit (1955), art critic
 Morris Dickstein (1961), cultural critic and professor at The Graduate Center, CUNY
 David Denby (1965), film critic for The New Yorker
 Michael Feingold (1966), lead theater critic for The Village Voice
 Martin Filler (1970), architecture critic
 Gerrit Henry (1972), art critic, author, poet
 Jed Perl (1972), art critic; son of Nobel laureate Martin Lewis Perl GSAS '55
 Lucy Sante (1976), literary critic
 Tim Page (1979), music critic of The Washington Post and winner of the Pulitzer Prize for Criticism
 Jonathan Beller (1985), cultural critic, professor at Pratt Institute 
 Michael Riedel (1989), theater critic for New York Post
 Ben Ratliff (1990), journalist and music critic
 Neil Strauss (1991), music critic and best-selling author
Justin Shubow (1999), architectural critic, former chairman and member of the United States Commission of Fine Arts
Helena Andrews (2002), pop culture critic

Broadcasters
 Robert Siegel (1968), host of All Things Considered on National Public Radio
 Jim Gardner (1970), anchor for WPVI-TV news in Philadelphia
 Christopher Kimball (1973), celebrity chef, editor-in-chief of Cook's Illustrated and host of America's Test Kitchen
 George Whipple III (1977), lawyer and society correspondent for NY1 
 Pimm Fox (1982), Bloomberg Radio and Bloomberg Television anchorman
 Fred Katayama (1982), anchor on Reuters Television
 James Rubin (1982), Sky News anchorman; former Assistant Secretary of State for Public Affairs in the Clinton Administration; spokesman for the presidential campaigns of Wesley Clark and John Kerry; husband of Christiane Amanpour
 George Stephanopoulos (1982), ABC News personality; senior advisor to U.S. President Bill Clinton's administration
 Greg Burke (1982), former Fox News correspondent and director the Holy See Press Office
 Claire Shipman (1986), ABC News correspondent
 Elizabeth Cohen (1987), CNN's senior medical correspondent
 Alexandra Wallace (1988), executive producer of NBC Nightly News
 Soterios Johnson (1990), host of Morning Edition on National Public Radio
 Alexis Glick (1994), anchorwoman for the Fox Business Network
 Suzy Shuster (1994), Emmy Award-winning sportscaster with ABC Sports
 Max Kellerman (1998), American boxing commentator and host of HBO World Championship Boxing
 Gideon Yago (2000), MTV News correspondent
Jonathan Lemire (2001), journalist and host of MSNBC's Way Too Early
 Charlotte MacInnis (2002), China Central Television anchor known by the stage name Ai Hua; host of Growing up with Chinese
 Buzzy Cohen (2007), Jeopardy! guest host and contestant, co-host of The Chase
 Meghan McCain (2007), former co-host of The View, blogger and daughter of Arizona senator John McCain

Editors
 Francis Pharcellus Church (1859), editorial writer for the New York Sun and author of Yes, Virginia, There is a Santa Claus
 Horatio Sheafe Krans (1894), author and editor
 Simeon Strunsky (1900), literary editor of the New York Evening Post and editorial writer for The New York Times
 Lester Markel (1914), The section of The New York Times edited by Markel, "Review of the Week", won the Special Awards and Citations Pulitzer Prize in 1953.
Daniel Longwell (1922), co-founder and managing editor of Life
 Theodore M. Bernstein (1924), assistant managing editor of The New York Times
 Herbert Solow (1924), editor of Fortune
 Groff Conklin (1927), science fiction anthologist
 Emanuel Freedman (1931), foreign editor of The New York Times
 James Wechsler (1935), editorial page editor of the New York Post
David Perlman (1939), former science editor of the San Francisco Chronicle
Lester Bernstein (1940), former editor-in-chief of Newsweek 
Werner Wiskari (1941), international news editor of The New York Times
 Lucien Carr (1946), editor for United Press International
 Byron Dobell (1947), editor of American Heritage, Esquire; mentor to journalists Tom Wolfe, David Halberstam, and Mario Puzo
 Charles Peters (1949), founder and former editor-in-chief of The Washington Monthly
 Ashbel Green (1950), senior editor and vice president of Alfred A. Knopf
Emile Capouya (1951), literary editor of The Nation from 1969 to 1981
Robert Gottlieb (1952), editor of The New Yorker and president of Alfred A. Knopf
Lawrence Van Gelder (1953), editor of the Arts and Leisure weekly section of The New York Times
 Max Frankel (1952), Pulitzer Prize winning executive editor of The New York Times
 Richard Locke (1962), critic, essayist and first editor of new incarnation of Vanity Fair magazine
 Leslie Pockell (1962), editor for Grand Central Publishing
Carey Winfrey (1963), editor-in-chief of Smithsonian magazine from 2001 to 2011
 Clark Hoyt (1964), public editor of The New York Times
Myron Magnet (1966), editor of City Journal from 1994 to 2006, National Humanities Medal recipient
 Chilton Williamson (1969), editor of the Chronicles magazine for the Rockford Institute
 Richard Snow (1970), editor of American Heritage magazine
 Paul Spike (1970), first American editor of Punch
 Leon Wieseltier (1974), literary editor, The New Republic
Scott McConnell (1975), founding editor of The American Conservative
 Dean Baquet (1978), Pulitzer Prize-winning executive editor of The New York Times
 John Glusman (1978), editor-in-chief of W. W. Norton & Company
 Marcus Brauchli (1983), former managing editor, The Wall Street Journal and executive editor of The Washington Post
 Michael Caruso (1983), former editor-in-chief of Smithsonian who coined the term "elevator pitch"
 Max Alexander (1987), senior editor of People
 Dave Kansas (1990), COO of American Public Media Group; former editor-in-chief of TheStreet.com
 Charles Ardai (1991), founder of Juno and Hard Case Crime
 Janice Min (1991), former editor of Us Weekly, co-president and chief creative officer of Guggenheim Partners, head of The Hollywood Reporter and Billboard
 Tim Griffin (1992), former editor-in-chief of Artforum, director and chief curator of The Kitchen
 Michael Schaffer (1995), editor of Washingtonian and former editor of Washington City Paper
 Franklin Foer (1996), editor, The New Republic
 Marco Roth (1996), co-founder and editor of n+1
 Christopher Bollen (1998), journalist, essayist, and former editor-in-chief of Interview Magazine
 Eli Sanders (1999), associate editor of The Stranger and winner of the Pulitzer Prize for Feature Writing in 2012
Sam Dolnick (2002), assistant managing editor of The New York Times, member of the Ochs-Sulzberger family
Yoni Appelbaum (2003), senior editor for politics, The Atlantic
 Matthew Continetti (2003), associate editor and writer, The Weekly Standard
 Will Welch (2003), editor-in-chief of GQ
 Bari Weiss (2007), editor at Tablet and The New York Times op-ed section
 Atossa Araxia Abrahamian (2008), journalist and senior editor of The Nation

Journalists
William Henry Leggett (1837), botanist and journalist who founded the Torrey Botanical Bulletin
 Henry Demarest Lloyd (1867), muckraking journalist, "father of investigative journalism"
 Herbert Agar (1919), journalist and historian, winner of the Pulitzer Prize for History in 1934
 Matthew Josephson (1920), American journalist credited with popularizing the term "Robber baron"
 Herbert Matthews (1922), foreign correspondent for The New York Times who first reported Fidel Castro alive in the Sierra Maestra
 David Cort (1924), foreign news editor at Life magazine
 William Brown Meloney V (1926), American journalist, son of noted journalist Marie Mattingly Meloney
 Ernest Cuneo (1927), president, North American Newspaper Alliance
 Harold Isaacs (1930), American journalist and MIT Professor who wrote extensively on the Chinese Civil War
 Peter C. Rhodes (1933), American journalist who worked for United Press International and the United States Office of War Information
 Harry Schwartz (1940), editorial writer for The New York Times
 Phelan Beale Jr. (1944), journalist; first cousin of Jacqueline Kennedy Onassis
 Charles E. Silberman (1945), author and journalist
 Kennett Love (1948), journalist for The New York Times
 David Wise (1951), author of espionage and national security nonfiction
 Daniel S. Greenberg (1953), American science journalist, brother of Jack Greenberg '45
 Barry Schweid (1953), Associated Press correspondent
 Walter Karp (1955), journalist, historian, contributing editor to Harper's Magazine
 Warren Boroson (1957), journalist; editor of Fact Magazine
 William E. Burrows (1960), author and journalist; founder of the Alliance to Rescue Civilization
 Thomas Lippman (1961), journalist and author specializing in the Middle East, correspondent for The Washington Post
 Lars-Erik Nelson (1962), New York Daily News columnist
 Allen Young (1962), journalist, author, political activist
Bernard L. Stein (1963), American journalist and winner of the Pulitzer Prize for Editorial Writing in 1998
 Michael Drosnin (1966), journalist and author on the Bible code
 Juan Gonzalez (1969), New York Daily News columnist
 Jeffrey Bruce Klein (1969), investigative journalist and co-founder of Mother Jones
 James Simon Kunen (1970), author of articles for Newsday, People, The New York Times Magazine and the novel The Strawberry Statement
 Glenn Frankel (1971), journalist for The Washington Post, winner of the 1989 Pulitzer Prize for International Reporting
 Juris Kaža (1971), journalist for Latvian News Agency LETA
 Jonathan Freedman (1972), American journalist and winner of the 1987 Pulitzer Prize for Editorial Writing
 John Brecher (1973), American journalist and wine critic for The Wall Street Journal
 Michael Wolff (1975), media columnist for New York Magazine and Vanity Fair, author of controversial book Fire and Fury on Donald Trump
 Bill Minutaglio (1976), American journalist, biographer of George W. Bush
 D. D. Guttenplan (1978), London correspondent and current editor of The Nation
 Michael Musto (1978), gossip columnist for The Village Voice
 Andrea di Robilant (1979), Italian journalist for La Stampa and professore
 Tim Weiner (1979), Pulitzer Prize-winning reporter for The New York Times specializing in national security matters
 Kevin Baker (1980), freelance journalist and novelist
 John Leland (1981), journalist for The New York Times
 Jason Zweig (1982), financial journalist and columnist for The Wall Street Journal
 Barry C. Lynn (1983), American journalist, senior fellow at the New America Foundation
 Ashley Kahn (1983), Grammy-winning music historian, journalist, and producer
 Daniel Wattenberg (1983), American journalist for The Washington Times, son of neoconservative pundit Ben J. Wattenberg
 N.J. Burkett (1984), award-winning correspondent for WABC-TV
 Matthew Cooper (1984), Time magazine White House correspondent and defendant in the Valerie Plame investigation
 Tom Watson (1984), journalist, entrepreneur
 Thomas Vinciguerra (1985), journalist, editor and author
 Naftali Bendavid (1986), Congress correspondent for The Wall Street Journal
 Susan Benesch (1986), journalist, free speech advocate
 Elizabeth Rubin (1987), American journalist for The New York Times Magazine, sister of Bloomberg News executive editor James Rubin '82
 Aram Roston (1988), American investigative journalist
 Edward Lewine (1989), author and freelance journalist
 Sam Marchiano (1989), television sportscaster, documentarian and activist, daughter of sportscaster Sal Marchiano
 David Streitfeld (1989), book reporter for The Washington Post; winner of the 2013 Pulitzer Prize for Explanatory Reporting
 Caroline Glick (1991), Israeli journalist, editor, writer
 Warren St. John (1991), journalist for The New York Times and former CEO of Patch
 Michael J. Socolow (1991), broadcast journalist and professor at the University of Maine
 Jesse Eisinger (1992), Pulitzer Prize-winning reporter for ProPublica
 Jean H. Lee (1992), former Associated Press bureau chief in Pyongyang and Seoul
 Jori Finkel (1992), art reporter for The New York Times and Los Angeles Times
Olivier Knox (1992), chief Washington correspondent for Sirius XM and former president of the White House Correspondents' Association
 Jim Frederick (1993), American author and journalist
 Russell Gold (1993), journalist for The Wall Street Journal and Pulitzer Prize-finalist
Michael Rothfeld (1993), journalist for The Wall Street Journal and winner of the 2019 Pulitzer Prize for National Reporting
 Brad Stone (1993), journalist for Bloomberg Business
 Anne Kornblut (1994), correspondent for The Washington Post, winner of the 2014 Pulitzer Prize for Public Service
 Joshua Prager (1994), journalist and author who writes on historical secrets
 Jodi Kantor (1996), writer and former editor on culture and politics for The New York Times, winner of the 2018 Pulitzer Prize for Public Service
Harriet Ryan (1996), journalist and winner of the 2019 Pulitzer Prize for Investigative Reporting
 Robin Shulman (1996), freelance journalist 
 Kate Kelly (1997), journalist for The New York Times
 Nicholas Kulish (1997), Berlin bureau chief for The New York Times and novelist
 Patrick Radden Keefe (1999), writer and investigative journalist
 David Epstein (2002), investigative reporter at ProPublica and author of the New York Times bestseller The Sports Gene
 Nick Schifrin (2002), Al Jazeera America's Middle East correspondent
 Ben Casselman (2003), economics reporter at The New York Times
 Jonah Lehrer (2003), former writer for The New Yorker discharged for falsifying quotes
 Poppy Harlow (2005), correspondent for CNN
 Sarah Maslin Nir (2005), investigative journalist for The New York Times
 Marc Tracy (2007), journalist for The New York Times, recipient of a 2011 National Magazine Award and a 2012 National Jewish Book Award
 Linette Lopez (2008), journalist for Business Insider involved in the December 15, 2022 Twitter suspensions
 Nellie Bowles (2010), technology journalist for The New York Times
 Cecilia Reyes (2015), winner of the Pulitzer Prize for Investigative Reporting in 2022

Pundits
 Frank Chodorov (1907), conservative activist, founder of the Intercollegiate Studies Institute, editor of The Freeman
Arnold Beichman (1934), conservative critic
 Ralph de Toledano (1938), conservative commentator, editor of National Review and Newsweek
 Joseph Kraft (1947), political columnist, speechwriter for John F. Kennedy
 Jules Witcover (1949), columnist, The Baltimore Sun
 Norman Podhoretz (1950), a "father of neoconservatism", editor of Commentary Magazine and author of Making It
 Jeffrey Hart (1952), conservative cultural critic and advisor to the Dartmouth Review
 David Horowitz (1959), conservative commentator and activist; author of the Academic Bill of Rights
 Herbert London (1960), conservative activist; former professor at New York University and first dean of the Gallatin School of Individualized Study; former president of conservative think tank Hudson Institute
 D. Keith Mano (1963), conservative political commentator for National Review
 Lawrence Auster (1971), Traditionalist conservative blogger and essayist
 Andrew Levy (1988), conservative commentator and host of Red Eye on Fox News

Sports journalists
 Jeremy Gaige (1951), chess archivist and journalist
 Paul Zimmerman (1955), football writer for Sports Illustrated known as "Dr. Z"
 Robert Lipsyte (1957), sports writer for The New York Times, correspondent for ABC News and host of The Eleventh Hour
 Chet Forte (1957), first director of Monday Night Football
 Steven Krasner (1975), sports journalist famous for covering the Boston Red Sox for The Providence Journal from 1986 to 2008
 Bob Klapisch (1979), sports writer for The Record and Fox Sports
 Gary Cohen (1981), television play-by-play announcer for the New York Mets

Legal and judicial figures
 Richard Harison (1764), first United States Attorney for the District of New York
 Peter van Schaack (1767), American loyalist and attorney
 Abraham Van Vechten (1780s), two-time New York Attorney General
 Anthony Bleecker (1791), lawyer and founding member of the New-York Historical Society
 Samuel Jones Jr. (1793), Recorder of New York City; Chancellor of New York; Chief Justice of the New York City Superior Court
 Augustus B. Woodward (1793), first Chief Justice of the Michigan Territory; one of the founders of the University of Michigan
 Thomas Phoenix (1795), New York County District Attorney
 Pierre C. Van Wyck (1795), New York County District Attorney; Recorder of New York City
 William P. Van Ness (1797), judge on the United States District Court for the Southern District of New York
 Sampson Simson (1800), attorney, philanthropist, remembered as the "father of Mount Sinai Hospital"
 Alexander Hamilton Jr. (1804), son of Alexander Hamilton, attorney, soldier, and member of the New York State Assembly
 Hugh Maxwell (1808), New York County District Attorney and Collector of the Port of New York
 Matthew C. Paterson (1809), New York County District Attorney
 Ogden Hoffman (1812), former New York State Attorney General, U.S. Attorney for the Southern District of New York, and U.S. congressman from New York
 Frederic de Peyster (1819), New York attorney
 Theodore Sedgwick III (1829), United States Attorney for the Southern District of New York
 Samuel Blatchford (1837), associate justice of the U.S. Supreme Court, Chief judge of the United States Court of Appeals for the Second Circuit, judge of the United States District Court for the Southern District of New York
 Ogden Hoffman Jr. (1840), judge on the United States District Court for the Northern District of California
 William Colford Schermerhorn (1840), lawyer, philanthropist, trustee of Columbia University
 Peter B. Sweeny* (1840s), New York County District Attorney in 1858
 Alexander McCue (1845), Solicitor of the United States Treasury from 1885 to 1888
 Joseph Larocque (1849), attorney; president of the New York City Bar Association
 Frederic René Coudert Sr. (1850), lawyer, founder of international law firm Coudert Brothers
 Myer J. Newmark* (1850s), youngest city attorney in the history of Los Angeles
 Elbridge Thomas Gerry (1857), lawyer and social reformer who founded the New York Society for the Prevention of Cruelty to Children; grandson of U.S. Vice President Elbridge Gerry
Gabriel Mead Tooker (1859), American lawyer and clubman, father in law of Whitney Warren of architectural firm Warren and Wetmore
 Edgar M. Cullen (1860), Chief Judge of the New York Court of Appeals
 Egerton Leigh Winthrop (1860), American lawyer and socialite 
 Emile Henry Lacombe (1863), judge on the United States Court of Appeals for the Second Circuit
 Henry Rutgers Beekman (1865), judge on the New York Supreme Court, former Corporation Counsel of New York City and Parks Commissioner
 George Goelet Kip (1865), American lawyer, heir and member of the Goelet family
 George Gosman DeWitt (1867), lawyer, philanthropist, former president of the Saint Nicholas Society of the City of New York
 Nicholas Fish II (1867), attorney, diplomat, investment banker; son of United States Secretary of State Hamilton Fish
 Willard Bartlett (1869), Chief Judge of the New York Court of Appeals
 Lewis Cass Ledyard* (1871), personal counsel to J. P. Morgan and namesake partner of Carter Ledyard & Milburn, transferred to Harvard University after freshman year
 Frederic Bronson (1871), lawyer and treasurer for New York Life and Trust Company, grandson of American Revolutionary War surgeon Isaac Bronson
 Thomas C. Bach (1875), judge on the Supreme Court of the Territory of Montana
 Francis S. Bangs (1878), attorney at Bangs, Stetson, Tracy, and McVeigh and trustee of Columbia College
 Frederick William Holls (1878), lawyer, publicist, Secretary of the United States delegation to the Hague Peace Conference
Edward De Peyster Livingston (1882), American lawyer and society leader during the Gilded Age
 Randolph B. Martine (1885), New York County District Attorney from 1885 to 1887
 John Vernou Bouvier Jr. (1886), lawyer and stockbroker, grandfather of Jacqueline Kennedy Onassis, Lee Radziwill and Edith Bouvier Beale 
 Benjamin Cardozo (1889), associate justice of the U.S. Supreme Court
 William Bondy (1890), judge on the United States District Court for the Southern District of New York
Irving Lehman (1896), chief judge of the New York Court of Appeals, son of Mayer Lehman and member of the Lehman family
Joseph M. Proskauer (1896), lawyer, judge, co-founder of international law firm Proskauer Rose
Frederic Kimber Seward (1899), corporate lawyer and Titanic survivor
 Arthur Garfield Hays (1902), counsel for the American Civil Liberties Union and lawyer in the Scopes Trial
Benjamin Kaye (1904), lawyer, playwright, co-founder of international law firm Kaye Scholer
George Z. Medalie (1905), United States Attorney for the Southern District of New York from 1931 to 1933 and Republican nominee for the United States Senate in New York in 1932
 Irwin Untermyer (1907), American jurist, civic leader, son of Samuel Untermyer
 Alexander Holtzoff (1908), judge on the United States District Court for the District of Columbia
 Paul Windels (1908), former Corporation Counsel of New York City and co-founder of the Lycée Français de New York
 Emil N. Baar (1913), New York Supreme Court justice and former chairman of the Union of American Hebrew Congregations
Albert Levitt (1913), judge on the District Court of the Virgin Islands
 Peter I. B. Lavan (1915), lawyer and philanthropist and namesake of Stroock & Stroock & Lavan
Raymond L. Wise (1916), American attorney and director of the American Civil Liberties Union
Horace Manges (1917), American attorney, name partner of Weil, Gotshal & Manges
 Benjamin Buttenwieser (1919), partner of Kuhn, Loeb, president of the United Jewish Appeal, grandson-in-law of Mayer Lehman and Adolph Lewisohn
 Alfred Egidio Modarelli (1920), judge on the United States District Court for the District of New Jersey
 George Rosling (1920), judge on the United States District Court for the Eastern District of New York
 Archie Owen Dawson (1921), judge of the United States District Court for the Southern District of New York
 Louis Nizer (1922), legendary trial lawyer who wrote My Life in Court
 Joseph Carmine Zavatt (1922), judge of the United States District Court for the Eastern District of New York
 Alan J. Altheimer (1923), lawyer and managing partner of Altheimer & Gray
 Milton Handler (1923), antitrust expert and Columbia Law School professor
 John T. Cahill (1924), U.S. Attorney for the Southern District of New York and founding partner of Cahill Gordon & Reindel
 Paul R. Hays (1924), judge of the United States Court of Appeals for the Second Circuit; wrote majority opinion that found I Am Curious (Yellow) to be not obscene
 Frank Hogan (1924), District Attorney of New York City
 George Jaffin (1924), attorney and philanthropist; major patron of Yaacov Agam
 Morton Baum (1925), lawyer and arts patron, former chairman of New York City Center
 Frederick van Pelt Bryan (1925), judge on the United States District Court for the Southern District of New York
 Abraham Feller (1925), general counsel to the Secretary-General of the United Nations Trygve Lie, close friend of Alger Hiss
 Jerome L. Greene (1926), lawyer, philanthropist
 Murray Gurfein (1926), judge on the United States District Court for the Southern District of New York, famous for presiding over the Pentagon Papers case
 Herbert M. Singer (1926), lawyer, philanthropist, former director of PepsiCo and president of Beth Israel Medical Center
 Edmund Louis Palmieri (1926), judge on the United States District Court for the Southern District of New York
 Milton Pollack (1927), judge of the United States District Court for the Southern District of New York
 Samuel Silverman (1928), justice on the New York Supreme Court; partner at Paul, Weiss, Rifkind, Wharton & Garrison who represented J. Robert Oppenheimer and Otto Frank, father of Anne Frank
 Arthur Krim (1930), partner in Phillips Nizer Benjamin Krim & Ballon and co-chairman of United Artists
 Gerald Dickler (1931), lawyer, chairman of the Pollock-Krasner Foundation and founding member of Capital Cities/ABC Inc.
 Charles Miller Metzner (1931), judge on the United States District Court for the Southern District of New York and the Temporary Emergency Court of Appeals
 Lawrence E. Walsh (1932), independent counsel in the Iran-Contra affair; 4th United States Deputy Attorney General
 William Golub (1934), lawyer and advisor to Governor Nelson Rockefeller
 Harold Leventhal (1934), judge on the United States Court of Appeals for the District of Columbia Circuit
 John Slate (1935), lawyer and name partner of Skadden Arps Slate Meagher & Flom
 Daniel Mortimer Friedman (1937), judge of the United States Court of Appeals for the Federal Circuit, last chief judge of the United States Court of Claims, and acting Solicitor General of the United States
 Wilfred Feinberg (1940), judge of the United States Court of Appeals for the Second Circuit
 Hugh H. Bownes (1941), judge of the United States Court of Appeals for the First Circuit
 Richard Kuh (1941), New York County District Attorney and prosecutor of Lenny Bruce for obscenity
 Leonard I. Garth (1942), senior judge on the United States Court of Appeals for the Third Circuit
 Charles L. Brieant (1944), judge of the United States District Court for the Southern District of New York
 Jack Greenberg (1945), civil rights lawyer who argued the Brown v. Board of Education case before the United States Supreme Court
 Roy Cohn (1946), attorney and counsel to Sen. Joseph McCarthy
 Arthur Lazarus Jr. (1947), American Indian rights lawyer, argued United States v. Sioux Nation of Indians and was involved in the Black Hills Land Claim
 John Lowenthal (1947), lawyer and documentary filmmaker known for his defense of Alger Hiss
 Norman Dorsen (1950), professor at the New York University School of Law and former president of the American Civil Liberties Union
Robert O. Harris (1951), labor lawyer and Chairman of the National Mediation Board
Norman Marcus (1953), New York City Planning Commission general counsel and zoning expert
 Richard H. Stern (1953), attorney and law professor
 David Braun (1954), music industry lawyer, former president of PolyGram Records
 Alvin Hellerstein (1954), US federal judge
 Isaac Shapiro (1954), head of international practice at Skadden, Arps, Slate, Meagher & Flom, former president of Japan Society
 Clarence Benjamin Jones (1956), attorney and advisor to Martin Luther King Jr.
 Jerome H. Kern (1957), founder of Wachtell, Lipton, Rosen & Katz, former CEO of Playboy and Colorado Symphony
 Bernard Nussbaum (1958), White House counsel under Bill Clinton
 Ezra G. Levin (1959), lawyer, co-chair of international law firm Kramer Levin Naftalis & Frankel
 David G. Trager (1959), judge on the United States District Court for the Eastern District of New York
 Robert Abrams (1960), Bronx Borough President and New York State Attorney General
 Frank Tuerkheimer (1960), Watergate prosecutor and former U.S. Attorney for the Western District of Wisconsin
 José A. Cabranes (1961), judge of the U.S. Court of Appeals; first Puerto Rican to sit in a U.S. District Court; current Trustee of Columbia University
 Michael B. Mukasey (1963), Attorney General of the United States; former chief judge of the United States District Court for the Southern District of New York
 David Saxe (1963), associate justice of the Appellate Division of the New York Supreme Court, First Judicial Department and former judge on the New York Supreme Court
 Peter Zimroth (1963), Assistant United States Attorney for the Southern District of New York and assistant New York County District Attorney, professor at the New York University School of Law
 Barry Kamins (1965), New York City Criminal Court judge and professor at the Fordham University School of Law and Brooklyn Law School
 Howard Matz (1965), senior judge of the United States District Court for the Central District of California
 Flemming L. Norcott Jr. (1965), former Associate Justice of the Connecticut Supreme Court
 Joel Klein (1967), assistant Attorney General of the United States; Chancellor of the New York City Department of Education
Anthony C. Moscato (1967), acting Inspector General of the Department of Justice and director of the Executive Office for United States Attorneys
 David M. Becker (1968), two-time general counsel of the U.S. Securities and Exchange Commission
 Nicholas G. Garaufis (1969), judge of the United States District Court for the Eastern District of New York and former chief counsel of the Federal Aviation Administration
Jonathan D. Schiller (1969), lawyer, co-founder of Boies Schiller Flexner LLP
Eric Eisner (1970), lawyer, former president of The Geffen Company and founder of the Young Eisner Scholars program
 William Barr (1971), Attorney General of the United States
 Arthur Helton (1971), lawyer, refugee advocate
 Gerard E. Lynch (1972), judge of the United States District Court for the Southern District of New York
 Gary Stephen Katzmann (1973), judge on the United States Court of International Trade
 Robert Katzmann (1973), judge of the United States Court of Appeals for the Second Circuit
 Eric Holder (1973), United States Attorney General under Barack Obama, Deputy Attorney General under Bill Clinton, United States Attorney for the District of Columbia, judge of the Superior Court of the District of Columbia
 Jonathan Cuneo (1974), American lawyer, founding partner of Cuneo Gilbert & LaDuca, LLP
 Abbe Lowell (1974), partner at Chadbourne & Parke, Chief Minority Counsel during the Impeachment of Bill Clinton
 Jeffrey L. Kessler (1975), co-chairman of Winston & Strawn; former Global Litigation Chair at Dewey & LeBoeuf
 Douglas Letter (1975), general counsel to the United States House of Representatives since 2018
J. Richard Cohen (1976), former president of the Southern Poverty Law Center
 Joseph A. Greenaway Jr. (1978), federal judge of the United States District Court for the District of New Jersey
 Rolando Acosta (1979), associate justice of the Appellate Division of the New York Supreme Court, First Judicial Department
 Frank J. Aquila (1979), American corporate lawyer, partner at Sullivan & Cromwell
 Umar Ata Bandial (1979), justice of the Supreme Court of Pakistan and former chief justice of Lahore High Court
 Lanny A. Breuer (1980), United States Assistant Attorney General for the Criminal Division
 Ronald Weich (1980), United States Assistant Attorney General for the Office of Legislative Affairs
 Paul Feinman (1981), judge of the New York Court of Appeals
 Michael H. Cohen (1983), healthcare law attorney, professor at Harvard Medical School
 Miguel Estrada (1983), controversial nominee to the United States Court of Appeals for the D.C. Circuit
 Steven Reich (1983), CEO of Deutsche Bank Trust Company and former associate deputy attorney general from 2011 to 2013
 Gary R. Brown (1985), judge of the United States District Court for the Eastern District of New York
 John H. Chun (1991), judge and nominee to the United States District Court for the Western District of Washington
 Andrew Ceresney (1993), chair of litigation practice at Debevoise & Plimpton and former head of enforcement at the U.S. Securities and Exchange Commission
 Veronica S. Rossman (1993), judge on the United States Court of Appeals for the Tenth Circuit
 Nancy Abudu (1996), lawyer and nominee to the United States Court of Appeals for the Eleventh Circuit
 Nusrat Jahan Choudhury (1998), lawyer and nominee to the United States District Court for the Eastern District of New York
 Roy Altman (2004), judge of the United States District Court for the Southern District of Florida
 Raph Graybill (2010), attorney, chief legal counsel to Steve Bullock and Democratic candidate in the 2020 Montana Attorney General election
 Shana Knizhnik (2010), American lawyer and author known for her book Notorious R.B.G.: The Life and Times of Ruth Bader Ginsburg

Military leaders
 Rudolphus Ritzema (1758), officer during the American Revolutionary War
 Edward Antill (1762), colonel and military engineer of the Continental Army who fought in the Battle of Quebec
 Nicholas Fish (177-), American Revolutionary War officer
 John Doughty (1770), served as Commanding General of the United States Army in 1784
 Stephen Lush (1770), American Revolutionary War officer
 Robert Troup (1774), soldier, lawyer, jurist, roommate of Alexander Hamilton at King's College
 Samuel Auchmuty (1775), British general, Commander-in-Chief, Ireland and commander of the Madras Army
 Marinus Willett (1776), colonel of the Continental Army, leader of the Sons of Liberty and 48th Mayor of New York City
 John Chrystie (1806), Colonel of the United States Army during the War of 1812
 Stephen Kearny* (1812), Conqueror of California in the Mexican–American War
 Charles Wilkes (1818), leader of the United States Exploring Expedition to survey the Pacific Ocean; instigator of the Trent Affair during the American Civil War
 Philip Kearny (1833), United States Army officer
 Henry M. Judah* (1840), United States Army officer during the Mexican–American War and the American Civil War
 John Watts de Peyster* (1840), Civil War general, military critic and historian
 Edward E. Potter (1842), officer during the American Civil War
 Augustus van Horne Ellis* (1844), Civil War general
William Cutting* (1851), American lawyer and soldierp
 Henry Eugene Davies (1857), Civil War general
William McNeill Whistler* (1857), American Confederate soldier and surgeon, brother of James Abbott McNeill Whistler
 Alfred Thayer Mahan* (1858), president, U.S. Naval War College and author of The Influence of Sea Power Upon History
 William Jay (1859), American soldier and lawyer, 40th president of the Saint Nicholas Society of the City of New York and great-grandson of first U.S. chief justice John Jay
Alister Greene (1875), American soldier and leader during the Gilded Age
Duncan Elliot (1884), American soldier and banker
 Hamilton Fish II (1895), first American killed in the Spanish–American War
 Ulysses S. Grant III* (1902), grandson of Ulysses S. Grant, entered with the class of 1902 but transferred to United States Military Academy
 Donald Armstrong (1909), brigadier general and commandant of the Army Industrial College
 John H. Hilldring* (1916), United States Major General and former Assistant Secretary of State for Occupied Areas
 Melvin Krulewitch (1916), United States Major General and president of the New York State Athletic Commission
 John F. "Jack" Hasey* (1940), American captain in the French Foreign Legion; recipient of the Order of Liberation

Musicians, composers, and lyricists
 Burnet Tuthill (1909), musicologist, conductor, founder and secretary of the National Association of Schools of Music
 Roy Webb (1910), composer for Notorious and Abe Lincoln in Illinois
 Richard Hale (1914), opera and concert singer; narrator, Peter and the Wolf
 Oscar Hammerstein II (1916), lyricist for Show Boat, Oklahoma! and The King and I, among other Broadway musical hits
 Howard Dietz (1917), director of publicity for MGM and lyricist for "Dancing in the Dark"
 Lorenz Hart (1918), lyricist for Pal Joey and other Broadway musical hits
 Richard Rodgers* (1923), composer and collaborator with Lorenz Hart and Oscar Hammerstein II; wrote music for Carousel, The Sound of Music, and Victory at Sea, among many others, one of the only two people to have won an Emmy, a Grammy, an Oscar, a Tony Award, and a Pulitzer Prize
 Elie Siegmeister (1927), composer, music teacher, writer on music
 Richard Franko Goldman (1930), composer, music professor, president of the Peabody Institute from 1969 to 1977
 Milton Katims (1930), conductor, music director of the Seattle Symphony from 1954 to 1976
 Mordecai Bauman (1935), American baritone
 Emerson Buckley (1936), conductor, The Crucible, The Ballad of Baby Doe; director of the Florida Grand Opera from 1950 to 1973
 Eddie Sauter (1936), jazz musician
 Elliott Schwartz (1936), American composer and professor emeritus of Bowdoin College
 John La Touche* (1937), lyricist for Cabin in the Sky and The Golden Apple
 Howard Shanet (1939), conductor and composer, former head of Columbia University's music department
 Leonard B. Meyer (1940), composer, author, philosopher known for his contributions to the Aesthetic theory of music
 Orrin Keepnews (1943), jazz record producer and winner of the 1988 Grammy Award for Best Album Notes and Best Historical Album.
 Mort Lindsey (1944), musical director for Judy Garland and Merv Griffin
 Dick Hyman (1948), musical director for Arthur Godfrey; composer or arranger for Hannah and Her Sisters and The Purple Rose of Cairo; Emmy Award winner
 Philip Springer (1950), composer known for writing the song Santa Baby
 Randy Starr (1951), dentist and composer for Elvis Presley
 Eric Salzman (1954), composer, producer, critic; founder of the American Music Theater Festival and composer-in-residence of the Center for Contemporary Opera
 Malcolm Frager (1955), American piano virtuoso
 Mike Berniker (1957), American musical producer and winner of nine Grammy Awards
Billy Goldenberg (1957), American composer and winner of four Emmy Awards
 John Corigliano (1959), winner of the Pulitzer Prize for Music and Academy Award for Best Original Score
 Edward Kleban (1959), lyricist for A Chorus Line
David Bromberg* (1960s), Grammy Award-nominated American musician
Art Rosenbaum (1960), Grammy Award-winning art professor and musician at Georgia State University
 Charles Wuorinen (1961), serialist composer and winner of the Pulitzer Prize for Music for Time's Encomium
 Charlie Morrow (1962), American sound artist and musician
 Joel Krosnick (1963), chamber musician and member of the Juilliard String Quartet
 David Rubinson (1963), record and music producer of Apocalypse Now, founder of San Francisco Records and The Automatt recording studio
 Art Garfunkel (1965), singer of Simon and Garfunkel, famous for the song "The Sound of Silence"
 Daniel Waitzman (1965), flutist and composer
 Kenneth Ascher (1966), Academy Award-nominated jazz pianist; writer of "Rainbow Connection" from The Muppet Movie
 David Schiff (1967), composer
 Tom Werman (1967), former record producer for Epic Records
 Billy Cross (1968), American guitarist, singer, and producer who lives in Denmark
 Jon Bauman (1969), "Bowzer" of Sha Na Na
 James "Plunky" Branch (1969), jazz musician
 Cameron Brown (1969), jazz bassist
 Emanuel Ax (1970), concert pianist
 Marc Copland (1970), jazz pianist and composer
Scott Simon (1970), member of Sha Na Na
 Frederick "Dennis" Greene (1971), member of Sha Na Na; professor of law at the University of Dayton
 Armen Donelian (1972), jazz pianist
 Jocko Marcellino (1972), member of Sha Na Na
 Phil Schaap (1973), Charlie Parker authority and multiple Grammy Award winner for engineering, production, and album notes
Eugene Drucker (1973), Grammy Award-winning violinist, member of the Emerson String Quartet
 Sam Morrison (1973), saxophonist
 Michael Jeffrey Shapiro (1973), American composer and conductor
 Richard Einhorn (1975), American composer, Voices of Light
 Phil Kline (1975), American composer
 Paul Phillips (1978), conductor, composer, and music scholar at Brown University
 Erik Friedlander (1982), American cellist, son of American photographer Lee Friedlander
 Robbie Fulks* (1984), Grammy Award-nominated American alternative country singer-songwriter
 Dave Nachmanoff (1986), award-winning American folk singer and sideman to Al Stewart
 John Bohlinger (1988), musician and music director on NBC program Nashville Star
 Laura Cantrell (1989), country musician
 Peter J. Nash (1989), member of 3rd Bass
 Mac McCaughan (1990), member of indie rockband Superchunk and founder of Merge Records
 Richard Carrick (1993), pianist, composer, professor at Berklee College of Music
 Gil Shaham (1993), violinist
 Jefferson Friedman (1996), American composer
 Tom Kitt (1996), American composer, co-winner of the 2010 Pulitzer Prize for Drama and the Tony Award for Best Original Score for his score of the musical Next to Normal
 R. Luke DuBois (1997), composer and artist
 Lauryn Hill* (1997), Grammy Award-winning R&B singer and songwriter, and member of The Fugees
 Sean Lennon* (1997), singer and songwriter, and son of John Lennon and Yoko Ono
 Orli Shaham (1997), pianist
 Yelena Dudochkin (1998), Ukrainian-American soprano
Scott Hoffman (1999), known by the stage name Babydaddy, member of the rock band Scissor Sisters
The Two Man Gentlemen Band, modern musical duo that consists of Fuller Condon (2000) and Andy Bean (2001)
Mason Bates (2000), Grammy Award-winning composer
Tom Frank (2000), journalist, former member of indie-rock band Jonathan Fire*Eater
 Hikaru Utada* (2000), Japanese pop star
 Alicia Keys* (2001), Grammy Award-winning R&B singer and songwriter
 Brian Weitz (2001), founding member of experimental band Animal Collective
 Emily and Julia Bruskin (2002), members of the Claremont Trio
Ken-David Masur (2002), musical director of the Milwaukee Symphony Orchestra, son of conductor Kurt Masur
 Ariana Ghez (2003), oboist
 Nico Muhly (2003), American contemporary classical music composer
Anna Bulbrook (2004), American violinist formerly member of indie band The Airborne Toxic Event
 Alisa Weilerstein (2004), American cellist and 2011 MacArthur Fellow
 Tristan Perich (2004), contemporary composer and sound artist
 Peter Cincotti (2005), pianist
 Ellen Reid (2005), composer and recipient of the 2019 Pulitzer Prize for Music
 Patrick Higgins (2006), composer, musician, producer
 Michael Barimo (2006), pop singer and whistler
 Rostam Batmanglij (2006), member of alt-rock band Vampire Weekend
 Ezra Koenig (2006), member of alt-rock band Vampire Weekend
 Chris Tomson (2006), member of alt-rock band Vampire Weekend
 Chris Baio (2007), member of alt-rock band Vampire Weekend
 Call Me Ace or Anthony Patterson (2011), American rapper
 Adam Met (2013), member of pop band AJR
 Danny Mercer (2013), singer, songwriter and producer
 Nathan Chan (2014), cellist
 Conrad Tao (2015), composer, pianist, violinist
 Jack Met* (2019), member of pop band AJR
 Maude Latour (2022), singer-songwriter

Playwrights, screenwriters, producers, and directors
 Henry Churchill de Mille (1875), playwright and Georgist; father of film pioneers Cecil B. DeMille and William C. deMille
 William C. deMille (1900), screenwriter, director, playwright; second president of the Academy of Motion Picture Arts and Sciences; co-founder of the USC School of Cinematic Arts
 Edgar Allan Woolf (1901), screenwriter, The Wizard of Oz
 George Middleton (1902), playwright and president of the Dramatists Guild of America
 Herman Mankiewicz (1917), drama critic for The New Yorker and co-winner of the Academy Award for Best Original Screenplay for Citizen Kane
 Morrie Ryskind* (1917), winner of the Pulitzer Prize for Drama with George S. Kaufman for Of Thee I Sing and co-writer of The Cocoanuts, Animal Crackers, and A Night at the Opera
 Sam Spewack (1919), winner of the Tony Award for the book of Kiss Me, Kate
 Sidney Buchman (1923), screenwriter for Mr. Smith Goes to Washington and winner of the Academy Award for Writing Adapted Screenplay for Here Comes Mr. Jordan
 Guy Endore (1923), screenwriter for The Story of G.I. Joe
 Alvah Bessie (1924), screenwriter for Objective, Burma! and one of the Hollywood Ten
 Ferrin Fraser (1927), radio scriptwriter for Little Orphan Annie and Frank Buck
 Joseph Mankiewicz (1928), Academy Award-winning writer and director of All About Eve and A Letter to Three Wives
 Frank S. Nugent (1929), screenwriter for Fort Apache, She Wore a Yellow Ribbon, and The Quiet Man
 Robert F. Blumofe (1930), producer of Bound for Glory, nominated for the Academy Award for Best Picture
 Ben Maddow (1930), screenwriter for The Asphalt Jungle, God's Little Acre and The Mephisto Waltz
 Albert Maltz (1930), screenwriter for Destination Tokyo and one of the Hollywood Ten
 Arnold M. Auerbach (1932), Primetime Emmy Award-winning American comedy writer
 William Ludwig (1932), Academy Award-winning screenwriter, Interrupted Melody
 Martin Manulis (1935), CBS television and movie producer, Days of Wine and Roses, The Best of Broadway, Climax!, Suspense; creator of Playhouse 90; former president of 20th Century Fox Television
 Charles H. Schneer (1940), film producer known for his collaboration with Ray Harryhausen
 I.A.L. Diamond (1941), screenwriting partner of Billy Wilder; co-author of Some Like It Hot; co-winner of the Academy Award for Best Original Screenplay for The Apartment
 Don M. Mankiewicz (1942), television and film writer; Academy Award nominee for I Want to Live!
 Steve Krantz (1943), screenwriter and film producer, Fritz the Cat
 Ernest Kinoy (1947), television writer of Murrow, Roots, and Victory at Entebbe
 Merrill Brockway (1948), Emmy Award-winning American television producer 
 Saul Turteltaub (1954), Emmy Award-nominated television writer and producer
 William Kronick (1955), American film and television writer, director and producer
 Stephen Schenkel (1956), American TV producer, All My Children
Milton Moses Ginsberg (1957), American director, Coming Apart
 Doran William Cannon (1959), screenwriter of Skidoo and Brewster McCloud
Richard Pearlman (1959), former director of the Washington National Opera as well as the training program at the Lyric Opera of Chicago
Terrence McNally (1960), Tony Award-winning playwright; author of Kiss of the Spider Woman and Ragtime
 Michael Kahn (1961), Artistic director of the Shakespeare Theatre Company in Washington, D.C.
 Brian De Palma (1962), director of Scarface, The Untouchables and Carrie
 Crawford Kilian (1962), Canadian novelist and professor at Capilano University
 Thomas H. Connell III (1964), chief stage manager of the Metropolitan Opera
 Christopher Trumbo (1964), screenwriter, The Don Is Dead ; son of noted screenwriter Dalton Trumbo
Paul Hirsch (1966), film editor, won the Academy Award for Best Film Editing in 1977 for his work on Star Wars
John Litvack (1966), EVP and head of programming at The WB Network
 Arthur Albert (1969), American cinematographer and television director
 Hoyt Hilsman (1970), playwright and screenwriter, son of former Assistant Secretary of State for East Asian and Pacific Affairs and Director of the Bureau of Intelligence and Research Roger Hilsman
 Glenn Switkes (1972), director and environmentalist
 Jim Jarmusch (1975), writer/director of the Coffee and Cigarettes series
 Howard Brookner (1976), director, Burroughs: The Movie, Robert Wilson and the Civil Wars
 Bill Condon (1976), winner of the Academy Award for Writing Adapted Screenplay for Gods and Monsters, director of Kinsey and Dreamgirls
 Ric Burns (1978), documentary filmmaker, New York: A Documentary Film, The Civil War
 Tony Kushner (1978), Academy Award-nominated screenwriter; winner of the Pulitzer Prize for Drama and Tony Award for Angels in America
 Michael Lehmann (1978), director of Heathers, 40 Days and 40 Nights, The Truth About Cats and Dogs and Hudson Hawk
 Cyril Christo (1982), filmmaker, son of Christo and Jeanne-Claude
 Ron Simons (1982), producer, four-time Tony Award winner
 P. J. Pesce (1983), co-creator of The Adventures of Chico and Guapo, director of From Dusk Till Dawn 3: The Hangman's Daughter
 Lodge Kerrigan (1985), American motion picture screenwriter and director of Rebecca H. 
 Scott McGehee (1985), director of Uncertainty
 Katharina Otto-Bernstein (1986), Emmy Award-nominated filmmaker, producer, screenwriter daughter of German Industrialist Werner Otto, billionaire heiress to the Otto GmbH fortune
 Cecily Rhett (1987), film editor, Stranger Inside
 Garth Stein (1987), Academy Award-winning producer, The Lunch Date
 Dan Futterman (1989), two-time Academy Award nominee for writing Capote and Foxcatcher
 Jessica Bendinger (1988), writer of Bring it On and for Sex and the City
 Andrew W. Marlowe (1988), creator of Castle; writer of Air Force One, End of Days, and Hollow Man
 Lawrence Trilling (1988), showrunner of Parenthood and Goliath
 Maiken Baird (1989), documentary film producer, Client 9: The Rise and Fall of Eliot Spitzer
 Sam Bisbee (1990), Emmy Award-winning producer and composer
Gina Fattore (1990), producer and writer of Dawson's Creek, Gilmore Girls, Parenthood, creator of Dare Me
Jeff Rake (1990), television producer, writer of Boston Legal and creator of Manifest and The Mysteries of Laura
 Dede Gardner (1990), Academy Award-winning producer of 12 Years a Slave; president of Plan B Entertainment
 Jenji Kohan (1991), television writer, producer, creator of Orange Is the New Black and Weeds
 Ari Gold (1992), filmmaker, director of Adventures of Power
 Elizabeth Craft (1993), producer, screenwriter, Fantasy Island, The 100, Lie to Me
 Ethan McSweeny (1993), former artistic director of the American Shakespeare Center, recipient of a 2018 Helen Hayes Award
 Brian Yorkey (1993), American playwright, co-winner of the 2010 Pulitzer Prize for Drama for writing the musical Next to Normal
 Anna Winger (1993), American screenwriter, creator of miniseries Deutschland 83, Deutschland 86, and Unorthodox
 Imara Jones (1994), political journalist and director 
 Nicole Kassell (1994), director and producer of Watchmen, winner of the 2020 Directors Guild of America Award for Outstanding Directing – Drama Series
 Tim Carvell (1995), head writer of The Daily Show and executive producer of Last Week Tonight with John Oliver
 Josh Fox (1995), Academy Award-nominated documentary director, Gasland
Adam Egypt Mortimer (1995), director of Daniel Isn't Real, Archenemy
 Henry Alex Rubin (1995), Academy Award-nominated director, Murderball
 Julius Sharpe (1995), television writer and showrunner of Making History and United We Fall
 Ramin Bahrani (1996), writer-director of Man Push Cart, Chop Shop and Fahrenheit 451, 2021 Academy Award for Best Adapted Screenplay nominee
 Moira Demos (1996), American filmmaker who produced famous Netflix documentary Making a Murderer
 Yana Gorskaya (1996), Academy Award-nominated film editor, Spellbound
 Cetywa Powell (1996), American director and fine art photographer
 Courtney Lilly (1997), television producer, showrunner of Black-ish, Grown-ish, Mixed-ish
Nancy Schwartzman (1997), director, Roll Red Roll
 Beau Willimon (1999), creator and producer of House of Cards and writer of the play Farragut North
 Vikram Gandhi (2000), director, Kumaré, Barry, reporter for Vice
 Andrew Goldberg (2000), creator of Netflix series Big Mouth
 Ned Benson (2001), director, The Disappearance of Eleanor Rigby
 Dan Harris (2001), Saturn Award-winning American screenwriter, X2, Superman Returns; director, Imaginary Heroes
 Andrew Neel (2001), American filmmaker, director of King Kelly, Goat
 Anna Boden (2002), co-writer of Half Nelson and director of Sugar, Captain Marvel
 Tze Chun (2002), award-winning director, Children of Invention
Lang Fisher (2002), co-creator of Never Have I Ever, writer of 30 Rock and Brooklyn Nine-Nine, Peabody Award winner in 2008
Susanna Fogel (2002), Emmy Award and BAFTA Award-nominated director\
Will Graham (2002), creator of the Onion News Network, showrunner of Mozart in the Jungle, Peabody Award winner in 2008
Ashley Lyle (2002), screenwriter, showrunner of Yellowjackets
 Justin Marks (2002), screenwriter, The Jungle Book, Counterpart
 Katori Hall (2003), American playwright, The Mountaintop, winner of the 2021 Pulitzer Prize for Drama
Raamla Mohamed (2003), Emmy Award-nominated screenwriter, Little Fires Everywhere
 Graham Moore (2003), winner of the 2015 Academy Award for Best Adapted Screenplay for his screenplay of The Imitation Game
 Lucia Aniello (2004), director of Rough Night and Time Traveling Bong
Gabe Liedman (2004), creator of Q-Force, writer of Brooklyn Nine-Nine, PEN15, Inside Amy Schumer and Kroll Show
Zhang Mo (2005), Chinese director, daughter of Zhang Yimou
 Laura Goode (2006), author, columnist, and producer of Farah Goes Bang
 Matt Kaplan (2006), producer of young adult films, To All the Boys franchise
 Meera Menon (2006), Indian American director, Equity
 Lilly Burns (2009), American television producer, co-founder of Jax Media and president of Imagine Entertainment
Eli Bush (2009), American film and theatre producer and winner of the Golden Globe Award in 2018 for Lady Bird
 Jason Fuchs (2009), American actor and screenwriter, Pan, Ice Age: Continental Drift
 Jessica Kingdon (2009), Academy Award-nominated Chinese American documentary director
 Nuotama Bodomo (2010), Ghanaian filmmaker and co-writer of sketch comedy Random Acts of Flyness on HBO
 Sabaah Folayan (2013), director of documentary Whose Streets?

Political and diplomatic figures

United States political and diplomatic figures
Philip Van Cortlandt (1758), soldier, statesman, United States Congressman from New York
 Anthony Hoffman (1760), member of the New York State Senate
 Gilbert Livingston (1760), member of the New York Provincial Congress
 Gulian Verplanck (1768), Speaker of the New York State Assembly and president of the Bank of New York from 1791 to 1799
 Philip Pell (1770), delegate for New York to the Congress of the Confederation
 Richard Varick (King's 1776), Mayor of New York City and American Revolutionary War figure; aide-de-camp of Benedict Arnold and private secretary of George Washington
 David A. Ogden (178-), United States Congressman from New York
 DeWitt Clinton (1786), Governor of New York who initiated the construction of the Erie Canal; also served as United States Senator from New York
 James Cochran (1788), United States Congressman from New York
 Daniel C. Verplanck (1788), United States Congressman from New York
 John Peter Van Ness (1789), United States Congressman from New York and mayor of Washington, D.C.
 George Graham (1790), acting U.S. Secretary of War under James Madison and James Monroe; Commissioner of the General Land Office from 1823 to 1830
 John Graham (1790), secretary of the Orleans Territory; U.S. Minister to Portugal; acting United States Secretary of State in 1817
 Jotham Post Jr. (1792), United States Congressman from New York
 John Randolph of Roanoke* (1792), planter, United States Congressman from Virginia, United States Senate from Virginia, United States Ambassador to Russia; founder of the American Colonization Society
 George Clinton Jr. (1793), brother of DeWitt Clinton, and United States Congressman from New York
 George Izard* (1793), general, politician; second Governor of the Territory of Arkansas
 James Parker (1793), United States Congressman from New Jersey
 Peter A. Jay (1794), son of Chief Justice John Jay; member of New York State Assembly and Recorder of New York City
 Cyrus King (1794), United States Congressman from Massachusetts
 John Ferguson (1795), Mayor of New York City
 Daniel D. Tompkins (1795), Vice President of the United States; Governor of New York
 Rensselaer Westerlo (1795), United States Congressman from New York
 Edward Philip Livingston (1796), member of the New York State Senate, great-great-grandfather of Eleanor Roosevelt
 Rudolph Bunner (1798), United States Congressman from New York
 John M. Bowers (1800s), United States Congressman from New York
 Gulian C. Verplanck (1801), United States Congressman from New York and chairman of the United States House Committee on Ways and Means
 Gouverneur Kemble (1803), United States Congressman from New York and founder of the West Point Foundry
 John L. Lawrence (1803), member of the New York State Assembly and the New York State Senate
 Alpheus Sherman (1803), member of the New York State Senate
 James Alexander Hamilton (1805), son of Alexander Hamilton, soldier, acting United States Secretary of State under president Andrew Jackson, and U.S. Attorney for the Southern District of New York from 1829 to 1834
 Edmund H. Pendleton (1805), United States Congressman from New York, great-nephew of Edmund Pendleton, first Chief Justice of Virginia
 Samuel B. Romaine (1806), Speaker of the New York State Assembly
 Egbert Benson (1807), member of the Board of Aldermen of New York City and 4th president of the Saint Nicholas Society of the City of New York, nephew of founding father Egbert Benson
 Henry H. Ross (1808), United States Congressman from New York
 Peter Dumont Vroom (1808), U.S. Minister to Prussia and Governor of New Jersey
 John Fine (1809), United States Congressman from New York
 John Slidell (1810), Confederate minister to France and a central figure of the Trent Affair during the American Civil War; United States Senator from Louisiana, brother-in-law of Admiral Matthew C. Perry
 Charles G. Ferris (1811), United States Congressman from New York
 Van Brugh Livingston (1811), Chargé d'Affaires to Ecuador
 Nathanael G. Pendleton (1813), United States Congressman from Ohio
 Samuel L. Gouverneur (1817), postmaster of New York City, private secretary, nephew, and son-in-law of President James Monroe
 James I. Roosevelt (1815), United States Congressman from New York; brother of Cornelius Roosevelt
 William Beach Lawrence (1818), U.S. chargé d'affaires for Great Britain and acting governor of Rhode Island
 William F. Havemeyer (1823), three-time Mayor of New York City
 William Duer (1824), United States Congressman from New York
 John McKeon (1825): U.S. Attorney, Southern District of New York; United States Congressman from New York
 Hamilton Fish (1827), US Secretary of State; Governor of New York; United States Senator from New York
 John Henry Hobart Haws (1827), United States Congressman from New York
 John D. Van Buren (1829), member of New York State Assembly
 Henry Ledyard (1830), Mayor of Detroit; president of Newport Hospital
 Henry Nicoll (1830), United States Congressman from New York
 Henry C. Murphy (1830), United States Congressman from New York; former United States Ambassador to the Netherlands
 John L. O'Sullivan (1831), US Minister to Portugal; journalist who coined the term "Manifest Destiny"; publisher of The United States Magazine and Democratic Review
 James William Beekman (1834), member of the New York State Senate; vice-president of the New York Hospital
 Isaac C. Delaplaine (1834), United States Congressman from New York
 John Richardson Thurman (1835), United States Congressman from New York
 John Jay (1836), grandson of Chief Justice John Jay; United States Minister to Austro-Hungary; president of the American Historical Association
 John Vanderbilt (1837), judge, member of the New York State Senate
 William Ward Duffield (1841), officer, member of the Michigan Senate, superintendent of the U.S. National Geodetic Survey
 Abram Stevens Hewitt (1842), former Mayor of New York City and planner of the first line of the New York City Subway system; Chairman of the Democratic National Committee from 1876 to 1877, son in law of philanthropist Peter Cooper
Edward Cooper (1842), former Mayor of New York City and son of industrialist Peter Cooper
 Nicholas B. La Bau (1844), member of the New York State Assembly and the New York State Senate
John Winthrop Chanler (1847), United States Congressman from New York
 Horace Carpentier (1848), first mayor of Oakland, California and president of the Overland Telegraph Company
 A. Bleecker Banks* (1850s), Mayor of Albany, New York; member of the New York State Assembly and the New York State Senate
 Galen A. Carter (1850), member of the Connecticut Senate
 Stewart L. Woodford (1854), Lieutenant Governor of New York and U.S. Minister to Spain
 Jacob Augustus Geissenhainer (1858), United States Congressman from New Jersey
 George Lockhart Rives (1868), United States Assistant Secretary of State and chairman of the Columbia trustees
 Hamilton Fish II (1869), Speaker of the New York State Assembly and U.S. Congressman
 Thomas C. E. Ecclesine (1870), member of the New York State Assembly and the New York State Senate
 Seth Low (1870), Mayor of New York City and president of Columbia University
 Oscar Solomon Straus (1871), first Jewish U.S. Cabinet secretary, U.S. Secretary of Commerce and Labor under Theodore Roosevelt, and U.S. Ambassador to the Ottoman Empire, first president of the American Jewish Historical Society
 Robert Anderson Van Wyck (1871), first Mayor of New York City to preside over all five boroughs
 Robert Ray Hamilton (1872), member of New York State Assembly, great-grandson of Alexander Hamilton
 P. Henry Dugro (1876), United States Congressman from New York
 Benjamin Barker Odell Jr.* (1877), Governor of New York; United States Congressman from New York
 Thomas G. Patten (1879), United States Congressman from New York
 Thomas F. Magner (1882), United States Congressman from New York
 Thomas Ewing III (1883), 33rd commissioner of the United States Patent and Trademark Office
 Herbert L. Satterlee (1883), Assistant Secretary of the Navy from 1908 to 1909, son-in-law of J. P. Morgan
 William Sulzer (1884), Governor of New York
 J. Mayhew Wainwright (1884), U.S. Congressman and Assistant Secretary of War
 Charles Henry Turner (1888), United States Congressman from New York; Doorkeeper of the United States House of Representatives from 1891 to 1893
 James W. Gerard (1890), United States Ambassador to Germany from 1913 to 1917
 Victor M. Allen (1892), member of the New York State Senate
 John F. Carew (1893), United States Congressman from New York
 Harvey R. Kingsley (1893), President pro tempore of the Vermont State Senate
 Edward Lazansky (1895), Secretary of State of New York
Carl L. Alsberg (1896), 2nd Commissioner of Food and Drugs, head of the Food and Drug Administration from 1912 to 1921
Lewis Einstein (1898), U.S. Ambassador to Czechoslovakia and U.S. Ambassador to Costa Rica
 John Purroy Mitchel (1899), Mayor of New York City
 Montgomery Schuyler Jr. (1899), U.S. Minister to El Salvador and U.S. Minister to Ecuador
 Charles H. Tuttle (1899), United States Attorney for the Southern District of New York and 1930 Republican nominee for Governor of New York
 Henry W. Shoemaker (1901), folklorist, historian, diplomat; United States Ambassador to Bulgaria from 1930 to 1933
 Martin C. Ansorge (1903), United States Congressman from New York
 Stanley M. Isaacs (1903), Manhattan Borough president from 1938 to 1942
 Allen J. Bloomfield (1094), member of the New York State Assembly and the New York State Senate
 Fred Biermann (1905), United States Congressman from Iowa
 John Collier (1906), U.S. Commissioner of Indian Affairs
Meyer Robert Guggenheim* (1907), United States Ambassador to Portugal from 1953 to 1954, grandson of Meyer Guggenheim
 Joseph C. O'Mahoney (1907), United States Senator from Wyoming
 James W. Mott (1909), United States Congressman from Oregon
 Emanuel Celler (1910), 39th Dean of the United States House of Representatives; United States Congressman from New York
 William Langer (1910), United States Senator and Governor of North Dakota
 Laurence Steinhardt (1913), former United States Ambassador to Sweden, Peru, the Soviet Union, Turkey, Czechoslovakia and Canada; the first United States Ambassador to be killed in office
 Henry Frank Holthusen (1915), American lawyer, diplomat, United States Ambassador to Czechoslovakia nominee
 Samuel Irving Rosenman (1915), 1st White House Counsel to presidents Franklin D. Roosevelt and Harry S. Truman, name partner of Katten Muchin Rosenman
 Frederic René Coudert Jr. (1918), United States Congressman from New York
 Harold F. Linder (1921), president of the Export-Import Bank of the United States from 1961 to 1968; former United States Ambassador to Canada
 Arthur Levitt Sr. (1921), longest-serving New York State Comptroller; father of Arthur Levitt, Chairman of the United States Securities and Exchange Commission
Joseph Zaretzki (1922), Majority Leader of the New York State Senate from 1966 to 1974
Louis M. Rousselot (1923), Assistant Secretary of Defense for Health and Environment from 1970 to 1971
 Joseph Campbell (1924), fourth Comptroller General of the United States
 Arthur F. Burns (1925), Chairman of the Federal Reserve and U.S. Ambassador to West Germany
 Bernard M. Shanley (1925), White House Counsel from 1953 to 1955; Secretary to the President of the United States under Dwight D. Eisenhower from 1955 to 1957
 Joseph F. Finnegan (1928), director of the Federal Mediation and Conciliation Service from 1955 to 1961
 Wolf Ladejinsky (1928), American agricultural economist and researcher and key adviser on land reform in Asian countries
 James T. O'Connell (1928), United States Deputy Secretary of Labor from 1957 to 1961
James J. Reynolds (1928), United States Deputy Secretary of Labor from 1967 to 1969
William H. Shaw (1930), Assistant Secretary of Commerce for Economic Affairs from 1966 to 1968
Boris Shishkin (1930), member of the President's Committee on Civil Rights and head of the AFL–CIO Department of Civil Rights
Arthur E. Goldschmidt (1932), United States Ambassador to the United Nations Economic and Social Council from 1967 to 1969
 Reed Harris (1932), former deputy director of the United States Information Agency and victim of McCarthyism
 James Hagerty (1934), White House Press Secretary from 1953 to 1961
Hickman Price (1934), Assistant Secretary in the United States Department of Commerce from 1961 to 1963; Kaiser-Frazer and Willys executive
 Faubion Bowers* (1935), General Douglas MacArthur's interpreter and Aide-de-camp during the Allied Occupation of Japan
 Hunter Meighan (1935), member of the New York State Assembly and the New York State Senate
Thomas Karamessines (1938), Deputy Director of CIA for Operations from 1967 to 1973
A. Gerdes Kuhbach (1938), executive director of the Port Authority of New York and New Jersey from 1973 to 1977
Thibaut de Saint Phalle (1939), director of the Export–Import Bank of the United States from 1977 to 1981
 Arthur R. Albohn (1942), member of the New Jersey General Assembly
Richard T. Davies (1942), former United States Ambassador to Poland
 David E. Mark (1943), former United States Ambassador to Burundi
 J. Owen Zurhellen, Jr. (1943), first United States Ambassador to Suriname
 Christian H. Armbruster (1944), member of the New York State Assembly and the New York State Senate
 Harold Brown (1945), U.S. Secretary of Defense and president of the California Institute of Technology
 Albert Burstein (1947), Democratic Party politician and former Majority leader of the New Jersey General Assembly
 Edward N. Costikyan (1947), Democratic Party politician and reformer who oversaw the dismantling of Tammany Hall; partner at Paul, Weiss, Rifkind, Wharton & Garrison
Gardiner L. Tucker (1947), former director of IBM Research and Assistant Secretary of Defense for System Analysis, Assistant Secretary General of NATO
Jonathan Dean (1948), United States Representative for Mutual and Balanced Force Reductions negotiations from 1979 to 1981
 Roy H. McVicker (1948), United States Congressman for Colorado's 2nd congressional district
 Monteagle Stearns (1948), former United States Ambassador to Ivory Coast and United States Ambassador to Greece
Eugene Rossides (1949), American lobbyist, football player drafted by the New York Giants in 1949, founder of the American Hellenic Institute, former United States Assistant Secretary of the Treasury
Donald A. Beattie (1951),  Assistant Secretary for Conservation and Solar Applications in the United States Department of Energy and Assistant Administrator of the Energy Research and Development Administration
Lawrence Pezzullo (1951), former United States Ambassador to Uruguay, Nicaragua, and special envoy to Haiti; executive director of Catholic Relief Services from 1983 to 1992
 Eric M. Javits (1952), former Ambassador and Permanent U.S. Representative to the Conference on Disarmament in Geneva from 2001 to 2003; United States Permanent Representative to the Organisation for the Prohibition of Chemical Weapons from 2003 to 2009
 James D. Theberge (1952), former United States Ambassador to Chile and Nicaragua
 G. Norman Anderson (1954), former United States Ambassador to Sudan
David J. Bardin (1954), Deputy Administrator of the Federal Energy Administration and Commissioner of the New Jersey Department of Environmental Protection
William Haddad (1954), American political operative, lobbyist, and journalist, Peace Corps founding official, aide to the Kennedy family, and grandson-in-law of Franklin D. Roosevelt
 Richard E. Benedick (1955), president emeritus of the National Council for Science and the Environment, ambassador, and chief United States negotiator to the Montreal Protocol
 John L. Hirsch (1957), United States Ambassador to Sierra Leone from 1995 to 1998
Morton Halperin (1958), Deputy Assistant Secretary of Defense, Director of Policy Planning for the U.S. State Department, and member of Richard Nixon's Enemies List
 Shelby Brewer (1959), Assistant Secretary of Energy for Nuclear Energy from 1981 to 1984
Benjamin Huberman (1959), acting director of the Office of Science and Technology Policy and acting Science Advisor to the President in 1981
 Pat Mullins (1959), Chairman of the Republican Party of Virginia
 Constantine Menges (1960), national security aide to Ronald Reagan
James E. Connor (1961), White House Cabinet Secretary and Staff secretary to President Gerald Ford
Brooks Firestone (1961), member of the California State Assembly from the 35th district from 1994 to 1998, founder of Firestone Vineyard and grandson of Harvey S. Firestone
Harvey Goldschmid (1962), professor at Columbia Law School, commissioner of the U.S. Securities and Exchange Commission from 2002 to 2005
John A. McMullen (1963), Vermont businessman and Republican Party candidate for the United States Senate representing Vermont in 1998, 2004, and Vermont Attorney General in 2012
 Jeff Bell (1965), Republican nominee for United States Senate from New Jersey in 1978, 1982, and in 2014
 Mark T. Cox IV (1966), former United States alternate executive director to the World Bank
Allan I. Mendelowitz (1966), former chairman and director of the Federal Housing Finance Board
 Raymond Burghardt (1967), former director, and chairman of the American Institute in Taiwan and U.S. Ambassador to Vietnam
 Dick Morris (1967), political strategist and advisor to President Bill Clinton and Mexican President Felipe Calderón
 Mark C. Minton (1967), former U.S. Ambassador to Mongolia, and former president of the Korea Society
 Robert Delahunty (1968), Deputy General Counsel, White House Office of Homeland Security from 2002 to 2003; professor at University of St. Thomas School of Law
 Judd Gregg (1969), United States Senator from New Hampshire; Governor of New Hampshire; United States Congressman
 Jerrold Nadler (1969), United States Congressman from New York
 Daniel L. Feldman (1970), member of the New York State Assembly from the 45th district
 Dov Zakheim (1970), Under Secretary of Defense from 2001 to 2004; advisor to the US presidential administrations of Ronald Reagan and George W. Bush
Bob Hackett (1971), member of the Ohio Senate from the 10th district
 Luis J. Lauredo (1972), United States Ambassador to the Organization of American States from 2001 to 2003
 Eric D. Coleman (1973), member of the Connecticut Senate
 Frank Dermody (1973), Democratic leader of the Pennsylvania House of Representatives
Stephen J. Flanagan (1973), former United States National Security Council senior director for Central and Eastern Europe
Steven Simon (1973), former United States National Security Council senior director for the Middle East and North Africa
Bradford Higgins (1974), Assistant Secretary of State for Resource Management and Chief Financial Officer of the United States Department of State
Robert Wunderlich (1975), mayor of Beverly Hills, California
 Donald Yamamoto (1975), former U.S. Ambassador to Ethiopia, Djibouti, and Assistant Secretary of State for African Affairs, current United States Ambassador to Somalia
Gilberto de Jesús (1976), former Maryland Secretary of Juvenile Justice from 1997 to 1999
Mozelle W. Thompson (1976), commissioner of the Federal Trade Commission from 1997 to 2004
 Howard W. Gutman (1977), former United States Ambassador to Belgium
Robert E. Martinez (1977), 8th Virginia Secretary of Transportation and deputy administrator of the United States Maritime Administration
 David Paterson (1977), first African American Governor of New York 
 Karl Dean (1978), mayor of Nashville
 Christopher Dell (1978), career diplomat, former US ambassador to Zimbabwe, Angola, and Kosovo
Martin J. Dunn (1979), former mayor of Holyoke, Massachusetts and member of the Massachusetts Senate
 Jim McGreevey (1978), 53rd Governor of New Jersey
 Andres Alonso (1979), former CEO of Baltimore City Public Schools
Timothy Horrigan (1979), member of the New Hampshire House of Representatives
 Randal Quarles (1981), 15th Under Secretary of the Treasury for Domestic Finance, chair of the Financial Stability Board and vice chairman of the Federal Reserve
 Andrew C. McCarthy (1981), Assistant United States Attorney and columnist for National Review
 Charles J. O'Byrne (1981), Secretary to the Governor of New York
 Michael Waldman (1982), speechwriter for president Clinton; president of the Brennan Center for Justice
 John Solecki (1982), U.S. official for the United Nations High Commissioner for Refugees, kidnapped in Pakistan by the Balochistan Liberation United Front in 2009
 Barack Obama (1983), 44th President of the United States and first African American to hold the office; former Senator from Illinois; winner of the 2009 Nobel Peace Prize
 Victor Cha (1983), foreign policy expert; President Bush's top advisor on North Korean affairs
 Jay Lefkowitz (1984), George W. Bush's special envoy for Human rights in North Korea
 Steven Waldman (1984), senior advisor to the Chairman of the Federal Communications Commission and founder of Beliefnet
 John Delaney (1985), United States Congressman for Maryland's 6th congressional district and candidate in the 2020 United States presidential election
 Julius Genachowski (1985), Chairman of the Federal Communications Commission
Hector Morales (1985), United States Ambassador to the Organization of American States from 2008 to 2009
 Daniel Lewis Foote (1986), former United States Ambassador to Zambia
Michael Mundaca (1986), former Assistant Secretary for Tax Policy in the U.S. Department of the Treasury 
Sharon Block (1987), Acting Administrator of the Office of Information and Regulatory Affairs, former member of the National Labor Relations Board and professor at Harvard Law School 
 David M. Friedman (1987), current United States Ambassador to Israel
 Matt Gonzalez (1987), Green Party San Francisco mayoral candidate and independent 2008 candidate for vice president running with Ralph Nader
Tim Kelly (1989), 74th mayor of Chattanooga, Tennessee
 Julie Menin (1989), former chairperson of Manhattan Community Board 1 and former commissioner of the New York City Department of Consumer Affairs
 Dave Hunt (1990), 65th Speaker of the Oregon House of Representatives and majority leader from 2007 to 2009 
 Michael Leiter (1991), Principal Deputy Director of the National Counterterrorism Center and former Deputy Chief of Staff for the Office of the Director of National Intelligence
 Melissa Mark-Viverito (1991), Speaker of the New York City Council
 Benjamin Lawsky (1992), attorney and New York City's first Superintendent of Financial Services
 Peter Hatch (1992), Commissioner of the New York City Department of Consumer and Worker Protection
 Eric Garcetti (1992), member of the Los Angeles City Council and current Mayor of Los Angeles, nominee to be United States Ambassador to India
 Rohit Aggarwala (1993), Commissioner of the New York City Department of Environmental Protection
 Matt Brown (1993), Secretary of State of Rhode Island from 2003 to 2007; co-founder of non-partisan group Global Zero
Alan D. Cohn (1993), Assistant Secretary for Strategy, Planning, Analysis & Risk of the United States Department of Homeland Security
Amit Bose (1994), Acting Administrator of the Federal Railroad Administration
Karthik Ramanathan (1994), Acting Assistant Secretary of the Treasury for Financial Markets
 Frank Scaturro (1994), lawyer, public advocate who spearheaded the restoration of Grant's Tomb; Republican candidate for New York's 4th congressional district
Radhika Fox (1995), Acting Assistant Administrator for Water of the United States Environmental Protection Agency
 Beto O'Rourke (1995), United States Congressman for Texas's 16th congressional district and candidate in the 2020 United States presidential election
 Rebekah Gee (1997), secretary of the Louisiana Department of Health, daughter of Ohio State University president E. Gordon Gee
 Jay Carson (1999), executive director of C40 Cities Climate Leadership Group; former press secretary for Hillary Clinton and Howard Dean's presidential campaigns
 John Ray Clemmons (1999), member of the Tennessee House of Representatives from the 55th district
 George Demos (1999), former U.S. Securities and Exchange Commission prosecutor and Republican candidate for New York's 1st congressional district
 Robert Karem (2000), Assistant Secretary of Defense for International Security Affairs and former acting Under Secretary of Defense for Policy
 David Segal (2001), member of the Rhode Island House of Representatives
 Robby Mook (2002), political campaign strategist and campaign manager for Virginia governor Terry McAuliffe, former executive director of Democratic Congressional Campaign Committee; campaign manager for Hillary Clinton presidential campaign, 2016
 Sam Arora (2003), member of the Maryland House of Delegates from 2011 to 2015
 Cyrus Habib (2003), Lieutenant Governor of Washington, first and only Iranian American elected to a state office in the United States
Adam Jentleson (2003), former deputy chief of staff to Harry Reid and columnist of GQ
 Nikil Saval (2005), former editor of N+1, member of the Pennsylvania State Senate
Josie Raymond (2007), member of the Kentucky House of Representatives from the 31st district
Ruthzee Louijeune (2008), at-large member of the Boston City Council
Sara Jacobs (2011), member of the United States House of Representatives for California's 53rd congressional district, granddaughter of Qualcomm founder Irwin M. Jacobs
 Peter Meijer (2012), American politician, member of the United States House of Representatives for Michigan's 3rd congressional district, grandson of Frederik Meijer, founder of Meijer hypermarkets
Shaun Abreu (2013), American politician, Democratic nominee for New York City's 7th City Council district
 Julia Salazar* (2014), member of New York State Senate for Democratic Socialists of America

Foreign political and diplomatic figures
 Henry Cruger* (1758), member of the Parliament of Great Britain from 1774 to 1790 and the New York State Senate
 Isaac Wilkins (1760), judge, member of the Nova Scotia House of Assembly
 Thomas Henry Barclay (1772), United Empire Loyalist; member of the 6th General Assembly of Nova Scotia
 Tang Shaoyi* (1882), first premier of the Republic of China
 William Sanford Evans (1895), Manitoba politician, Mayor of Winnipeg from 1909 to 1911
 Pixley ka Isaka Seme (1906), founder and president of the African National Congress
 Wellington Koo (1909), President of the Republic of China and China's ambassador to the United States; Chinese delegate to the Paris Peace Conference, 1919 and the League of Nations; judge on the International Court of Justice from 1957 to 1967
Jun Ke Choy (1915), former mayor of Hangzhou, chairman of China Merchants Group, and founder of the Chinese Culture Center
Yu Tsune-chi (1922), Chinese Ambassador to Italy and Spain, delegate to the San Francisco Conference, United Nations and the International Labour Organization
 Mario Laserna Pinzón (1948), Colombian diplomat and educator; founded the Universidad de Los Andes
 Colin Hughes (1949), first commissioner of the Australian Electoral Commission
 Uldis-Ivars Grava (1958), Latvian parliamentarian, former director of Latvijas Televīzija and chairman of American Latvian Association
 Johan Jorgen Holst (1960), Norwegian Minister of Defence and Foreign Affairs; heavily involved with the Oslo Accords
 Yossi Alpher (1964), former Mossad officer and director of the Jaffee Center for Strategic Studies at Tel Aviv University
 Dore Gold (1975), Israeli political advisor and diplomat; former ambassador to the United States
 Toomas Hendrik Ilves (1975), President of Estonia
Carson Wen (1975), three-time Hong Kong deputy to the National People's Congress and former vice chairman of the Democratic Alliance for the Betterment and Progress of Hong Kong
 Geoffrey Onyeama (1977), Nigerian Minister of Foreign Affairs since 2015, son of Nigerian justice Charles Onyeama
 Michael Oren (1977), Israeli historian and former Israeli ambassador to the United States
 Miloon Kothari (1979), United Nations special rapporteur on adequate housing
 Kim Hyun-jong (1981), former South Korean Minister of Trade and Special Advisor to President Moon Jae-in
 Ken Ofori-Atta (1984), Ghanaian economist and investment banker and current Minister for Finance and Economic Planning, member of the Ofori-Atta family
Akiva Tor (1985), Israeli ambassador to South Korea
 Abdullah bin Khalid bin Sultan Al Saud (2010), Saudi Arabia's permanent representative to the United Nations in Vienna, ambassador to Austria, Slovakia and Slovenia, great-grandson of Ibn Saud

Publishers
 George Haven Putnam* (1864), publisher of G. P. Putnam's Sons, son of publisher George Palmer Putnam
 Henry S. Harper (1888), director of Harper and Brothers, Titanic survivor
 Bernard H. Ridder (1903), publisher of The St. Paul Dispatch and The Pioneer Press, chairman emeritus of Ridder Publications
 Alfred Harcourt (1904) and Donald Brace (1904), founders of Harcourt Brace
Joseph E. Ridder (1907), publisher of The Journal of Commerce and chairman of Ridder Publications
 John Neville Wheeler (1908), founder and owner of the North American Newspaper Alliance and Bell Syndicate
 Harold Latham (1909), editor-in-chief of Macmillan Inc. known for discovering Margaret Mitchell
 Alfred A. Knopf (1912), founder and chairman of Alfred A. Knopf
 George T. Delacorte Jr. (1913), founder of Dell Publishing
 Arthur Hays Sulzberger (1913), publisher of The New York Times
 Douglas Black (1916), president of Doubleday and Company
 Bennett Cerf (1920), founder of Random House
 Donald S. Klopfer* (1922), founder of Random House
 Richard L. Simon (1920) and Max Lincoln Schuster (1919), co-founders of Simon & Schuster
 Elliott V. Bell (1925), former editor and publisher of Businessweek
 David A. Boehm (1934), founder of Sterling Publishing
 Robert Giroux (1936), chairman of Farrar, Straus and Giroux
 Ian Ballantine (1938), founder of Ballantine Books
 Walter B. Pitkin Jr. (1938), editor-in-chief and executive vice president of Bantam Books
 William D. Carey (1940), executive officer of the American Association for the Advancement of Science and publisher of Science from 1975 to 1987
Robert Bleiberg (1943), former publisher and managing editor of Barron's
Gilman Kraft (1947), former owner and publisher of Playbill
 Jason Epstein (1949), editorial director of Random House and co-founder of the New York Review of Books
Bernard Shir-Cliff (1949), editor of Ballantine Books and Warner Books
 Arthur Ochs Sulzberger (1951), publisher of The New York Times
 Lee Guittar (1953), former publisher of the San Francisco Examiner, The Denver Post, Dallas Times Herald, and president of USA Today
 Richard Goodwin Capen, Jr. (1956), former publisher of the Miami Herald and the United States Ambassador to Spain from 1992 to 1993
 Peter Mayer (1956), publisher of Overlook Press and former CEO of Penguin Books
 Daniel Leab (1957), historian, antiquarian and publisher book catalogues, former editor of Labor History
 Donald Welsh (1965), founding publisher of outdoors magazine Outside
Albert Scardino (1970), publisher of The Georgia Gazette and Pulitzer Prize winner in 1984
 Louis Rossetto (1971), founder and publisher of Wired magazine
 David Rothkopf (1977), CEO and editor of Foreign Policy magazine
 John R. MacArthur (1978), president and publisher of Harper's magazine, grandson of billionaire John D. MacArthur, benefactor of the MacArthur Fellows Program
 Jake Dobkin (1998), co-founder and publisher of Gothamist franchise

Religious figures
 Samuel Provoost (1758), third Presiding Bishop of the American Episcopal Church
 John Beardsley (1761), Church of England clergyman in Canada; chaplain of the Loyal American Regiment
 Benjamin Moore (King's 1768), second bishop of the Episcopal Diocese of New York and president of Columbia College
 Philip Frederick Mayer (1799), Lutheran clergyman; founder of the Pennsylvania Bible Society, the first of its kind in the United States
 Henry Onderdonk (1805), second Episcopal bishop of Pennsylvania
 Jackson Kemper (1809), first missionary bishop of the Episcopal Church in the United States
 Benjamin Treadwell Onderdonk (1809), fourth bishop of the Episcopal Diocese of New York
 Richard Fish Cadle (1813), Episcopalian priest and first superior of Nashotah House
 Manton Eastburn (1817), fourth bishop of the Episcopal Diocese of Massachusetts
 Henry John Whitehouse (1821), second bishop of the Episcopal Diocese of Chicago
 George Washington Bethune* (1823), theologian and preacher
 John Chester Backus* (1830), American Presbyterian minister
 Morgan Dix (1848), priest, theologian, rector of Trinity Church
 William Edmond Armitage (1849), second bishop of the Episcopal Diocese of Milwaukee
 George Franklin Seymour (1850), first bishop of the Episcopal Diocese of Springfield
 James DeKoven (1851), leader of the Anglo-Catholic movement in the Episcopal Church
 Marvin Vincent (1854), Presbyterian minister and professor at the Union Theological Seminary in the City of New York
 Daniel S. Tuttle (1857), first bishop of the Episcopal Diocese of Idaho, Montana, and Utah
 William David Walker (1859), first bishop of the Episcopal Diocese of North Dakota
 Henry Y. Satterlee (1863), first bishop of the Episcopal Diocese of Washington; established the Washington National Cathedral
 Bernard Drachman (1882), leader of Orthodox Judaism; former president of the Orthodox Union
 Herbert Shipman (1890), Suffragan bishop in the Episcopal Diocese of New York
 Stephen Samuel Wise (1892), rabbi and Zionist leader
 Frederick Herbert Sill (1895), Anglican monk and founder of the Kent School
 Henry S. Whitehead (1904), rector, and author of horror fiction
 Vedder Van Dyck (1918), fifth bishop in the Episcopal Diocese of Vermont
 Walter M. Higley (1922), sixth bishop of the Episcopal Diocese of Central New York 
M. Moran Weston (1930), Episcopal priest, social activist, and businessman who co-founded Carver Federal Savings Bank
 Arthur Lelyveld (1933), rabbi, president of the American Jewish Congress and first Jewish editor-in-chief of the Columbia Daily Spectator
 Moshe Davis (1936), rabbi and founder of Camp Ramah
Paul van K. Thomson (1937), Roman Catholic priest, professor at Providence College
 Thomas Merton (1938), Trappist monk, writer, humanist; author of The Seven Storey Mountain
 Robert Farrar Capon (1946), Episcopal priest and author
 Haskel Lookstein (1953), Modern Orthodox Rabbi; spiritual leader of Congregation Kehilath Jeshurun and principal of Ramaz School since 1966
 Harold Kushner (1955), rabbi and writer
 Adi Da (1961), born Franklin Albert Jones, American spiritual teacher; founder of a new religious movement, Adidam 
 Michael Lerner (1964), liberal rabbi and editor of Tikkun magazine
 Elliot N. Dorff (1965), conservative rabbi, chairman of the Rabbinical Assembly's Committee on Jewish Law and Standards
 Joseph Goldstein (1965), American vipassana expert
 Alan Senauke (1969), Soto Zen priest, folk musician, and poet residing at the Berkeley Zen Center; former director of the Buddhist Peace Fellowship
 Taigen Dan Leighton (1971), Soto Zen priest and teacher, academic at the Institute of Buddhist Studies
 C. John McCloskey (1975), Catholic priest who helped prominent figures convert to Catholicism, including Newt Gingrich, Bernard Nathanson, Sam Brownback, and Lawrence Kudlow
 Haviva Ner-David (1991), Israeli feminist activist and rabbi
 Sharon Brous (1995), first woman to be named most influential rabbi by Newsweek

Scientists and inventors
 Samuel Bard* (1763), personal physician to George Washington; founder of the Columbia University College of Physicians and Surgeons
 John Stevens (King's 1768), builder of the first oceangoing steamboat in the United States
 Nicholas Romayne* (1774), physician, president of the Columbia University College of Physicians and Surgeons
 David Hosack (1790), physician, botanist, educator
 John Eatton Le Conte (1800), American naturalist
 Valentine Mott (1806), American surgeon pioneer
 James Renwick (1807), English-American scientist and engineer, professor of Natural philosophy at Columbia University; father of architect James Renwick Jr.
 John Brodhead Beck (1813), New York physician
 Daniel Levy Maduro Peixotto (1816), Dutch-born Jewish American physician, former president of the Willoughby Medical College
 Henry James Anderson (1818), scientist and educator who participated in the U.S. Dead Sea exploration expedition
 Alfred Charles Post (1822), American surgeon, professor at New York University School of MedicineS
 Horatio Allen (1823), imported the Stourbridge Lion, first successful steam locomotive to run in the United States
John Clarkson Jay (1827), American physician and notable conchologist, grandson of John Jay
 Alfred W. Craven (1829), chief engineering of Croton Aqueduct; founding member of the American Society of Civil Engineers
 Edward S. Renwick (1839), mechanical engineer, patent expert
 Oliver Wolcott Gibbs (1841), chemist, president of the National Academy of Sciences and the American Association for the Advancement of Science
 Robert Ogden Doremus* (1842), chemist and physician
 Cornelius Rea Agnew (1849), physician who helped founding the Manhattan Eye, Ear and Throat Hospital
 Henry Carrington Bolton (1862), chemist and bibliographer of science
 Stuyvesant Fish Morris (1863), American physician, nephew of Hamilton Fish '27
 Rudolph August Witthaus (1867), American toxicologist
 Frederick Remsen Hutton (1873), engineer, president of the American Society of Mechanical Engineers
 Sylvanus Albert Reed (1874), aerospace engineer who developed the modern metal aircraft propeller, for which won the 1925 Collier Trophy
 William Hallock (1879), American physicist, professor at Columbia University
 William Barclay Parsons (1879), chief engineer of the first line of the New York City Subway system, founder of multinational engineering firm Parsons Brinckerhoff
 Michael I. Pupin (1879), physicist, winner of the Pulitzer Prize for biography
 Henry Crampton (1893), American evolutionary biologist
 Harold Jacoby (1894), astronomer and professor at Columbia University
 John Duer Irving (1896), geologist, professor at Sheffield Scientific School of Yale University
 Richard Weil (1896), American physician, professor at Weill Cornell Medicine, son-in-law of Isidor Straus
 Hans Zinsser (1899),  American physician, bacteriologist, prolific author
 Marston T. Bogert (1890), former president of the American Chemical Society and the Society of Chemical Industry
 William King Gregory (1900), American zoologist, primatologist, paleontologist
 Reuben Ottenberg (1902), physician and haematologist
 Clinton Gilbert Abbott (1903), ornithologist, naturalist, director of the San Diego Natural History Museum
 Irving Langmuir (1903), winner of the 1932 Nobel Prize in Chemistry
 Edward Calvin Kendall (1906), winner of the 1950 Nobel Prize in Physiology or Medicine
 Harold E. B. Pardee (1906), pioneer in electrocardiogram research, namesake of Pardee's sign
 Grover Loening (1908), American aircraft manufacturer, founder of Loening Aeronautical Engineering; developed the Loening Model 23 which won the 1921 Collier Trophy
 Michael Heidelberger (1909), immunologist, "father of modern immunology"
 Ernst Philip Boas (1910), American physician and professor at Columbia University College of Physicians and Surgeons, son of German-American anthropologist Franz Boas
 Hermann Joseph Muller (1910), geneticist and winner of the Nobel Prize in Physiology or Medicine
 Ralph Randles Stewart (1911), botanist and founder of the National Herbarium, Islamabad
 Ludlow Griscom (1912), pioneer in field ornithology
 John Howard Northrop (1912), winner of the 1946 Nobel Prize in Chemistry
 Calvin Bridges (1912), geneticist, protege of Thomas Hunt Morgan known for his contribution to genetics
 Irving H. Pardee (1912), American neurologist, husband of Abby Rockefeller
 Alfred Sturtevant (1912), geneticist, protege of Thomas Hunt Morgan and winner of the National Medal of Science
 James Chapin (1916), American ornithologist; 17th president of The Explorers Club
 Seeley G. Mudd (1917), American physician and philanthropist, former dean of Keck School of Medicine of USC 
 Harold Alexander Abramson (1919), early advocate of Psychedelic therapy
 Augustus Braun Kinzel (1919), metallurgist and first president of the National Academy of Engineering
 William V. Silverberg (1919), founder of the American Academy of Psychoanalysis and Dynamic Psychiatry
Sherman Fairchild* (1920), founder of Fairchild Aircraft, Fairchild Industries, Fairchild Camera and Instrument as well as Fairchild Semiconductor
Francis Bitter (1925), American physicist, inventor of Bitter electromagnets
Howard Bruenn (1925), personal physician to Franklin D. Roosevelt
Albert Charles Smith (1926), American botanist, former director of the National Museum of Natural History and the Arnold Arboretum
 Konrad Lorenz* (1926), winner of the Nobel Prize in Physiology or Medicine
 Jerrold R. Zacharias (1926), nuclear physicist, professor at Massachusetts Institute of Technology
 Andrew Streitwieser (1927), American chemist known for his contributions to Physical organic chemistry
 Julian M. Sturtevant (1927), American chemist at Yale University
 Raymond D. Mindlin (1928), American engineer, Medal for Merit and ASME Medal recipient
 Harold Charles Bold (1929), American botanist
 Jule Eisenbud (1929), American psychiatrist known for research into parapsychology
 Theodore Lidz (1930), Sterling Professor of psychiatry at Yale; expert on Schizophrenia
 Judd Marmor (1930), American psychoanalyst and psychiatrist on homosexuality
 Herbert L. Anderson (1931), director of the Enrico Fermi Institute, professor of the University of Chicago
 Paul E. Queneau (1931), professor of metallurgical engineering at Dartmouth College
Bernard Glueck Jr. (1933), American psychiatrist, former president of the American Psychopathological Association
Irving Kaplan (1933), American chemist, professor at Massachusetts Institute of Technology
 Leo Rangell (1933), psychoanalyst; president of the International Psychoanalytical Association and the American Psychoanalytic Association
 John K. Lattimer (1935), urologist, ballistics expert, and inveterate collector
 Emanuel Papper (1935), anesthesiologist, dean of the Leonard M. Miller School of Medicine from 1969 to 1981
 Norman Foster Ramsey Jr. (1935), winner of the Nobel Prize in Physics
 Robert Marshak (1936), president of the American Physical Society and president of the City College of New York
 Julian Schwinger (1936), winner of the Nobel Prize in Physics; posited the Schwinger effect
 Barry Commoner (1937), leading American environmentalist, former editor of Science Illustrated magazine
 Francis J. Ryan (1937), professor of zoology at Columbia University
Boris Jacobsohn (1938), Professor of Physics at the University of Washington
David B. Hertz (1939), operations research scholar known for pioneering the Monte Carlo methods in finance 
 Victor Wouk (1939), pioneer in the development of electric and hybrid vehicles
Julius Ashkin (1940), American nuclear physicist, brother of Arthur Ashkin '47
 Jeremiah Stamler (1940), epidemiologist, expert in the field of preventive cardiology, professor emeritus at Northwestern University
 Ulrich P. Strauss (1941), chemist at Rutgers University, 1971 Guggenheim Fellow
 Bruce Wallace (1941), geneticist, professor at Virginia Tech
 Robert S. Wallerstein (1941), American psychoanalyst and former president of the International Psychoanalytical Association and director of the Langley Porter Psychiatric Institute, brother of political scientist Immanuel Wallerstein '51
 Kimball Chase Atwood III (1942), geneticist, professor at Columbia University Medical School
 Leon Davidson (1942), chemical engineer known for his work in the Manhattan Project and the study of Unidentified Flying Objects
 Karl Koopman (1943), chiropterologist and curator at the American Museum of Natural History
 Robert G. Shulman (1943), biophysicist, Sterling Professor emeritus at Yale University
 Seymour Jonathan Singer (1943), cell biologist and professor at the University of California, San Diego
 Enoch Callaway (1943), psychiatrist, professor at the University of California, San Francisco
 Arnold Cooper (1944), psychoanalyst; professor at Weill Cornell Medical College and former president of the American Psychoanalytic Association
 Robert Jastrow (1944), astronomer, founder of NASA's Goddard Institute for Space Studies and conservative think tank George C. Marshall Institute
 Joshua Lederberg (1944), winner of the Nobel Prize in Physiology or Medicine
 Arnold Scheibel (1944), professor of neuroscience at the University of California, Los Angeles
 Alfred P. Wolf (1944), nuclear and organic chemist; research professor at New York University
 Paul Marks (1945), geneticist, president emeritus of the Memorial Sloan Kettering Cancer Center, former editor-in-chief of the Journal of Clinical Investigation
 Jack Oliver (1945), professor of seismology at Columbia University and Cornell University
 Malvin Ruderman (1945), American physicist known for discovering the RKKY interaction
 Leonard Shengold (1946), psychiatrist at New York University known for study on child abuse
 Albert Starr (1946), noted cardiovascular surgeon, winner of the 2007 Lasker Award
 Arthur Ashkin (1947), winner of the Nobel Prize in Physics in 2018
 Robert A. Frosch (1947), fifth administrator of the National Aeronautics and Space Administration
Norton Zinder (1947), American scientist who discovered bacterial transduction
 Frank I. Marcus (1948), American cardiologist and professor at University of Arizona Medical Center
 Frederick Reif (1948), professor of physics and psychology at Carnegie Mellon University, recipient of the 1994 Robert A. Millikan Award
 Robert Neil Butler (1949), president of the International Longevity Center and winner of the Pulitzer Prize for General Non-Fiction
 William Chinowsky (1949), American astrophysicist and professor at the University of California, San Diego
 Edgar Housepian (1949), neurosurgeon, co-founder of the Fund for Armenian Relief
 Benjamin Widom (1949), professor of chemistry at Cornell University; recipient of the Boltzmann Medal in 1998
 Noel Corngold (1950), American physicist at California Institute of Technology
Edwin Kessler (1950), first director of the National Severe Storms Laboratory
 Gerald Weissmann (1950), cell biologist, liposome inventor, essayist
 Arthur H. Westing (1950), American ecologist and researcher at Stockholm International Peace Research Institute
 Leon Cooper (1951), winner of the Nobel Prize in Physics in 1972
 Richard A. Gardner (1952), psychiatrist known for researching Parental alienation syndrome
Edgar Haber (1952), former president of Bristol-Myers Squibb and professor at Harvard Medical School
Donald E. Ross (1952), engineer and managing partner at Jaros, Baum & Bolles
 William Carl Burger (1953), botanist, curator at the Field Museum of Natural History
 Gerald Feinberg (1953), physicist who coined the term "tachyon"
 Bernard Friedland (1953), professor and engineer, New Jersey Institute of Technology, recipient of the 1982 Rufus Oldenburger Medal
 Arthur Gottlieb (1953), American immunologist, professor at Tulane University School of Medicine
 Eliot S. Hearst (1953), psychologist, professor at Indiana University
 Charles Kadushin (1953), psychologist at the City University of New York, recipient of the 2009 Marshall Sklare Award
 Donald R. Olander (1953), professor of nuclear engineering at University of California, Berkeley
 Nicholas P. Samios (1953), former director of the Brookhaven National Laboratory
 Melvin Schwartz (1953), winner of the Nobel Prize in Physics in 1988
 Wallace Smith Broecker (1953), professor of environmental science at Columbia University, developed the idea of a global "conveyor belt" linking ocean circulation
 Richard K. Bernstein (1954), physician and advocate for Low-carbohydrate diet
 Henry Buchwald (1954), professor of surgery and biomedical engineering at University of Minnesota
 Neil D. Opdyke (1955), geologist
 Alvin F. Poussaint (1956), professor of psychiatry and dean of freshmen at the Harvard Medical School
 A. Charles Catania (1957), American psychologist, professor at University of Maryland, Baltimore County
 Sheldon Saul Hendler (1957), American scientist, physician, and musician
 Ralph Feigin (1958), American pediatrician; former president and CEO of Baylor College of Medicine and physician-in-chief of Texas Children's Hospital
 Roald Hoffman (1958), winner of the Nobel Prize in Chemistry
 Norbert Hirschhorn (1958), American public health physician and developed the Oral rehydration therapy
 Gerald T. Keusch (1958), professor of the Boston University School of Public Health and director of the John E. Fogarty International Center at the National Institutes of Health
 Harlan Lane (1958), professor of psychology at Northeastern University
 Hans Christian von Baeyer (1958), physicist at the College of William & Mary
 Joseph L. Fleiss (1959), professor of biostatistics at the Columbia University Mailman School of Public Health
 Allan Franklin (1959), American physicist, historian of science at University of Colorado Boulder
 Paul B. Kantor (1959), American information scientist, professor at Rutgers University
 Michael Lesch (1960), physician and medical educator who identified the Lesch–Nyhan syndrome
 Ira Black (1961), American physician and neuroscientist, advocate of Stem cell research; former president of Society for Neuroscience
 Kenneth C. Edelin (1961), American physician known for his support of abortion rights and former chairman of Planned Parenthood
 Eugene Milone (1961), astronomer, professor at the University of Calgary
 Robert Pollack (1961), American biologist who studies the intersections between science and religion
 Samuel Strober (1961), immunologist at Stanford Medical School, co-founder of Dendreon
 Charles Cantor (1962), molecular geneticist; chief science officer at Sequenom
 Armando Favazza (1962), American author and psychiatrist at the University of Missouri
 Stephen Larsen (1962), American psychologist and founding board member of the Joseph Campbell Foundation
 Robert Lefkowitz (1962), winner of the Nobel Prize in Chemistry
 Jeffrey Mandula (1962), physicist known for the Coleman–Mandula theorem
 Allen Neuringer (1962), American psychologist, prominent in the field of the experimental analysis of behavior
 Russell F. Warren (1962), surgeon-in-chief of the Hospital for Special Surgery from 1993 to 2003 and team doctor for the New York Giants
 Farhad Ardalan (1963), Iranian High Energy physicist and professor at Sharif University and the Institute for Studies in Theoretical Physics and Mathematics.
 Harvey Cantor (1963), American immunologist, professor of microbiology & immunobiology at Harvard Medical School
 David B. Cohen (1963), psychologist, professor at the University of Texas at Austin
Allen Frances (1963), American psychiatrist at Duke University and founding editor of the Journal of Personality Disorders and the Journal of Psychiatric Practice
David George Hitlin (1963), physicist at the California Institute of Technology
Michael Lubell (1963), American physicist, professor of the City College of New York
Kenneth X. Robbins (1963), psychiatrist, scholar on expatriate communities in India
 Richard Waldinger (1963), computer scientist, fellow of the Association for the Advancement of Artificial Intelligence
 Allan Blaer (1964), American physicist and professor who is in charge of the Columbia University Science Honors Program
 Frederick Kantor (1964), Physicist, inventor of glancing incidence X-ray telescope
 Richard A. Muller (1964), professor of physics at the University of California, Berkeley; winner of the MacArthur Fellowship in 1982 and the Alan T. Waterman Award in 1978; founder of climate science institute Berkeley Earth
 Kenneth Prager (1964), American physician, professor at Columbia University Medical Center, brother of commentator Dennis Prager
 Mark C. Rogers (1964), American physician, former CEO of Duke University Health System
 Michael Terman (1964), Columbia University Medical Center psychologist
 Norman Christ (1965), physicist, professor at Columbia University
 Niles Eldredge (1965), collaborator of Stephen Jay Gould and curator of the Department of Invertebrates at the American Museum of Natural History
 Alan I. Green (1965), professor at Geisel School of Medicine, nephew of Herman Wouk
 Stuart Newman (1965), developmental and evolutionary biologist
 Allen Steere (1965), rheumatologist and pioneering investigator of Lyme disease
 Sylvain Cappell (1966), American mathematician, professor at the Courant Institute of Mathematical Sciences
 Barry S. Coller (1966), father of Abciximab, Vice President and Physician-in-Chief at Rockefeller University
 Peter Gray (1966), American psychologist; professor at Boston College
 Brian Weiss (1966), psychiatrist noted for his research on reincarnation and past life regression
 Richard Axel (1967), winner of the Nobel Prize in Physiology or Medicine for studying the operations of the olfactory system
Nai Phuan Ong (1967), Professor of Physics at Princeton University
Nick Scoville (1967), professor of astronomy at California Institute of Technology
Robert Wald (1968), American theoretical physicist at the University of Chicago
 Sidney R. Nagel (1969), University of Chicago physicist specializing in the complex physics of everyday materials
 Thomas B. Kornberg (1970), American biochemist who was the first to purify and characterize DNA polymerase II and DNA polymerase III
 Harold J. Vinegar (1970), former chief scientist for physics of Shell plc, professor at Ben-Gurion University of the Negev
 Franklin G. Miller (1971), bioethicist at the National Institutes of Health
 Eric Rose (1971), American cardiothoracic surgeon known for performing the first successful paediatric heart transplant and former president of the International Society for Heart and Lung Transplantation
 Paul S. Appelbaum (1972), psychiatrist credited with conceptualizing the idea of therapeutic misconception
 Steven M. Bellovin (1972), professor of computer science at Columbia University and chief technologist of Federal Trade Commission
 Rick L. Danheiser (1972), American chemist and chair of the faculty at Massachusetts Institute of Technology
 Mitchell Kronenberg (1973), American immunologist, former president of the La Jolla Institute for Immunology and secretary of the American Association of Immunologists
 Stephen M. Barr (1974), author and professor of physics and astronomy at the University of Delaware
David Jablonski (1974), professor of geophysical sciences at University of Chicago
 Mark G. Lebwohl (1974), American dermatologist and president of the American Academy of Dermatology
 Robert F. Murphy (1974), American computational biologist and professor at Carnegie Mellon University
 Steven Kahn (1975), astrophysicist, professor at Stanford University and director of the Large Synoptic Survey Telescope
 Andrew Witkin (1975), professor of computer science at Carnegie Mellon University and Pixar senior scientist, recipient of the 2006 Academy Scientific and Technical Award
 John Markowitz (1976), psychiatrist, professor at Columbia College of Physicians and Surgeons
 Douglas Rivers (1977), professor at Stanford University, chief scientist of global polling firm YouGov
 David Tannor (1978), chemist, professor at the Weizmann Institute of Science
 George Yancopoulos (1980), American billionaire biomedical scientist and CSO of Regeneron Pharmaceuticals 
 Carl Haber (1980), physicist and winner of the MacArthur Fellowship in 2013
 Jonathan E. Aviv (1981), American surgeon known for inventing the Flexible Endoscopic Evaluation of Swallowing with Sensory Testing technique and developing the Transnasal esophagoscopy method
 Adrian R. Krainer (1981), co-winner of the 2018 Breakthrough Prize in Life Sciences
 Neil Shubin (1982), paleontologist and co-discoverer of Tiktaalik, provost of the Field Museum of Natural History
 Michael Travisano (1983), evolutionary biologist and professor at University of Minnesota, Twin Cities
 Peter Lunenfeld (1984), critic and theorist of digital media
Peter Marks (1985), director of the Center for Biologics Evaluation and Research and member of the White House Coronavirus Task Force
James Nowick (1985), professor of chemistry at the University of California, Irvine
 Eric M. Genden (1987), American head and neck surgeon who performed the first jaw transplant using the patient's jaw and bone marrow
Geoffrey Miller (1987), psychologist, professor at the University of New Mexico
 Leslie B. Vosshall (1987), neurobiologist known for her contributions in the field of olfaction
 Patrick Ball (1988), data scientist, executive director of the Human Rights Data Analysis Group
 Rebecca N. Wright (1988), American computer scientist and professor at Barnard College, former director at DIMACS
 Jonathan Rosand (1989), professor of neurology at Harvard Medical School, son of art historian David Rosand '59
 Christopher S. Ahmad (1990), head team physician of the New York Yankees and professor of Columbia University Vagelos College of Physicians and Surgeons
 Jennifer Ashton (1991), physician, author, host of lifestyle talk show The Revolution
 Virginia Cornish (1991), professor of chemistry at Columbia University and recipient of the 2009 Pfizer Award in Enzyme Chemistry
 Carl Marci (1991), neuroscientist and professor at Harvard Medical School
 Peter DiMaggio (1992), structural engineer, co-CEO of Thornton Tomasetti
 Damon Horowitz (1993), Google's in-house philosopher
Chris Wiggins (1993), professor of applied mathematics at Columbia University, chief data scientist of The New York Times
Rebecca Oppenheimer (1994), curator in astrophysics the American Museum of Natural History
Demetre Daskalakis (1995), physician and gay health activist, White House National Monkeypox Response Deputy Coordinator
Laura Kaufman (1997), chemist, professor at Columbia University
 Beth Willman (1998), American astronomer at Haverford College
 Kate Brauman (2000), water scientist at the University of Minnesota, daughter of chemist John Isaiah Brauman
Alex K. Shalek (2004), professor at Institute for Medical Engineering and Science, Massachusetts Institute of Technology
Kerstin Perez (2005), particle physicist and professor at Columbia University
Daniel Harlow (2006), professor at Massachusetts Institute of Technology, winner of the 2019 New Horizons in Physics Prize
Aaron Roth (2006), professor of computer science at University of Pennsylvania
 Andrea Young (2006), American experimental physicist at the University of California, Santa Barbara, winner of the 2018 New Horizons in Physics Prize
 Julia Kalow (2008), American chemist, professor at Northwestern University
 Calvin Sun (2008), emergency room doctor notable for his first-hand reporting on the COVID-19 pandemic in New York City

Spies
 John Vardill (1766), American loyalist educator, pamphleteer, spy
 William Joseph Donovan (1905), head of the Office of Strategic Services, predecessor to the Central Intelligence Agency, "Father of American Intelligence"
 Isaiah Oggins (1920), communist activist and Soviet spy
 Whittaker Chambers* (1924), Soviet spy and accuser of Alger Hiss
 Nathaniel Weyl (1931), operative in the Ware group of Soviet spies in the United States
 Victor Perlo (1933), leader of the Perlo group of Soviet spies in the United States
 Frank Snepp (1965), former CIA station chief for Saigon during the Vietnam War

Writers
 Clement Clarke Moore (1798), purported author of A Visit From St. Nicholas
 Robert Charles Sands (1815), poet and writer
 Charles Fenno Hoffman (1825), poet, translator, and editor, founder of  The Knickerbocker magazine
 Cornelius Mathews* (1834), American writer of the Young America movement
 Evert Augustus Duyckinck (1835), literary biographer in the Young America movement
 George Templeton Strong (1838), noted diarist; founder of the United States Sanitary Commission and the Union League Club of New York
 Edgar Fawcett (1867), novelist
 William Dudley Foulke (1869), American literary critic, journalist, and reformer; former United States Civil Service Commission Commissioner
 Duffield Osborne (1879), author
 John Kendrick Bangs (1883), author, satirist, editor of Puck magazine
 John Armstrong Chaloner (1883), American writer and activist, brother of Lewis Stuyvesant Chanler and William A. Chanler, son of John Winthrop Chanler '47, husband of Amélie Rives Troubetzkoy
 Albert Payson Terhune (1893), author, dog breeder, journalist, Further Adventures of Lad
 Guy Wetmore Carryl (1895), humorist, Fables for the Frivolous
 Melville Henry Cane (1900), poet; winner of the Robert Frost Medal in 1971
 Joyce Kilmer (1908), poet and author of Trees
 Randolph Bourne (1912), essayist and public intellectual
 Harold Lamb (1915), writer, screenwriter
 Gustav Davidson (1919), poet, secretary of the Poetry Society of America
 Paul Gallico* (1919), author of The Poseidon Adventure
 Louis Zukofsky (1922), co-founder and leading theorist of the Objectivist poets
 James Warner Bellah (1923), Western and pulp writer whose stories formed the basis of such John Ford classics as Fort Apache, She Wore a Yellow Ribbon, and Rio Grande.
 Corey Ford* (1923), humorist, The John Riddell Murder Case
 Henry Morton Robinson (1923), author of The Cardinal and A Skeleton Key to Finnegans Wake
 Cornell Woolrich (1923), mystery writer and author of Rear Window
 Clifford Dowdey (1925), author on the American Civil War
 Herman Wouk (1934), author of War and Remembrance and winner of the Pulitzer Prize for Fiction for The Caine Mutiny
 John Berryman (1936), winner of the Pulitzer Prize for Poetry
 Robert Paul Smith (1936), author of Where Did You Go? Out. What Did You Do? Nothing.
 Robert Lax (1938), minimalist poet
 Ed Rice (1940), Beat Generation writer
 Walter Farley (1941), author of The Black Stallion and its many sequels
 Thomas Gallagher (1941), winner of a 1960 Edgar Award and National Book Award for Fiction finalist 
 Gerald Green (1942), writer of Holocaust and The Last Angry Man, co-creator of NBC's The Today Show
Richard de Mille* (1944), writer and investigative journalist, son of director Cecil B. DeMille
 Jack Kerouac* (1944), Beat generation author of On the Road
 Leonard Koppett (1944), sportswriter; recipient of the J. G. Taylor Spink Award and the Curt Gowdy Media Award
 Walter Wager (1944), mystery writer whose book 58 Minutes was adapted into Die Hard 2
 Herbert Gold (1946), Beat Generation novelist
 Daniel Hoffman (1947), poet; 22nd United States Poet Laureate
 Hiag Akmakjian (1948), author
 Allen Ginsberg (1948), Beat generation poet; author of Howl
 Frederick Karl (1948), literary biographer famous for his work on Joseph Conrad
Stanley Loomis (1948), American expatriate writer
Charles Simmons (1948), American author, winner of the 1965 William Faulkner Foundation Award for notable first novel
 Louis Simpson (1948), American poet; winner of the 1964 Pulitzer Prize for Poetry
 John Clellon Holmes (1949), Beat Generation novelist, Go.
 John Hollander (1950), poet, MacArthur Fellow and winner of the Bollingen Prize
 Richard Howard (1951), translator and winner of the Pulitzer Prize for Poetry
 Anthony Robinson (1953), English professor and novelist
 Ralph Schoenstein (1953), humorist
 Dan Wakefield (1955), novelist, journalist, screenwriter
 John J. Clayton (1956), fiction writer, novelist
 Robert Silverberg (1956), science fiction writer, recipient of the Damon Knight Memorial Grand Master Award in 2004
 Paul Zweig (1956), poet, memoirist, 1976 Guggenheim Fellow
 George Bellak (1957), American television writer
 Richard P. Brickner (1957), writer, 1983 Guggenheim Fellow
 Raymond Federman (1957), French–American novelist and academic; author, Double or Northing
 Lawrence Shainberg (1958), writer of Zen Buddhism
 Jerome Charyn (1959), novelist
 Jay Neugeboren (1959), novelist, essayist, short story writer
 Robert T. Westbrook* (1968), writer, son of syndicated columnist Sheilah Graham Westbrook
 Phillip Lopate (1964), essayist and fiction writer
 Ron Padgett (1964), poet and translator, winner of the Shelley Memorial Award in 2009 and Robert Frost Medal in 2018
 Steven Millhauser (1965), novelist and winner of the Pulitzer Prize for Fiction for Martin Dressler: The Tale of an American Dreamer
 Aaron Fogel (1967), poet
 Eric Van Lustbader (1967), espionage and thriller novelist, writer of Jason Bourne novels
 Thomas Hauser (1968), author of nonfiction and biographer
 David Shapiro (1968), poet, literary critic, professor at William Paterson University
 Hilton Obenzinger (1969), novelist, poet, history and criticism writer
 Paul Auster (1970), postmodern writer; author of The New York Trilogy, Moon Palace, and the Brooklyn Follies
 Bob Holman (1970), poet and activist identified with the oral tradition
 David Lehman (1970), poet, editor of The Best American Poetry series
 Joshua Rubenstein (1971), writer, winner of a National Jewish Book Award in 2002
 Alex Abella (1972), Cuban-American writer
 Brad Gooch (1973), writer, professor of English at William Paterson University
 John Prados (1973), author and historian on World War II and the Cold War
 Todd McEwen (1975), writer, professor at the University of Kent
Stephen O'Connor (1975), American writer and professor at Sarah Lawrence College
 Damien Bona (1977), chronicler of the Academy Awards
Mason Wiley (1977), co-author of The Official Preppy Handbook
 Kevin Baker (1980), novelist and freelance journalist
 Jeffrey Harrison (1980), poet who won the 1988 Amy Lowell Poetry Travelling Scholarship
 Lou Antonelli (1981), science fiction writer
 Douglas Sadownick (1981), writer and psychologist
 Michael Friedman (1982), novelist and author
 Michael Azerrad (1983), author, journalist, musician
Thomas Dyja (1984), writer, historian, winner of the 1997 Casey Award
 David Rakoff (1986), comedic essayist
 Louise Wareham Leonard (1987), writer
 Al Weisel (1987), freelance writer
 Adrienne Brodeur (1988), author, program director at Aspen Institute
Glen Hirshberg (1988), author, recipient of the 2007 Shirley Jackson Award
 Adam Mansbach (1988), author and former professor of literature at Rutgers University–Camden
 Darryl Pinckney (1988), novelist, playwright, and essayist
 Mako Yoshikawa (1988), novelist, professor at Emerson College
 Ben Coes (1989), author of political thriller and espionage novels
 Wade Graham (1989), author, historian, environmentalist
 G. Winston James (1989), poet, author, activist
 Robert Salkowitz (1989), author on technology innovation
 Carol Guess (1990), novelist and poet; professor at Western Washington University
 John Reed (1990), novelist; author of Snowball's Chance
 David S. Levinson (1991), American short-story writer and novelist
Robert Kolker (1991), writer, author of Hidden Valley Road
 Kelly Link (1991), Hugo Award-winning American author; founder of Small Beer Press; editor of St. Martin's Press's Year's Best Fantasy and Horror
 Loren Goodman (1991), postmodern poet, professor at Underwood International College
 Andrew Carroll (1992), author, editor, activist, and historian
 Jordan Davis (1992), poet
 John Bemelmans Marciano (1992), American children's book author and illustrator, grandson of Ludwig Bemelmans, author of Madeline
 Marie Mutsuki Mockett (1992), American writer
 Melissa de la Cruz (1993), writer known for work in young adult fiction
 Jay Michaelson (1993), writer and LGBTQ activist
 Maxine Swann (1994), fiction writer
 Robert Westfield (1994), writer who won two Lambda Literary Awards
 Megan McCafferty (1995), chick lit writer, Jessica Darling series, which were plagiarized by Kaavya Viswanathan
 Tova Mirvis (1995), author
 Saleemah Abdul-Ghafur (1996), author and Islamic activist
 Fredrik Stanton (1996), author of Great Negotiations and former publisher for the Columbia Daily Spectator
 Aravind Adiga (1997), Man Booker Prize-winning novelist
Jamel Brinkley (1997), American author, winner of the 2018 Ernest J. Gaines Award for Literary Excellence
 John Coletti (1997), American author
 Gotham Chopra (1997), author, son of health advocate Deepak Chopra
 Lauren Grodstein (1997), author, professor of Rutgers University–Camden
Abdi Nazemian (1998), Iranian-American author, winner of the 2017 Lambda Literary Award for Debut Fiction
Trevor Shane (1998), writer
 Daniel Alarcón (1999), novelist
 Katherine Howe (1999), novelist, author of The Physick Book of Deliverance Dane
 Rebecca Pawel (1999), author of mystery novels; winner of the 2004 Edgar Allan Poe Award for Best First Novel
 Alex Marzano-Lesnevich (2001), author, winner of a 2018 Lambda Literary Award and Chautauqua Prize
 Fiona Sze-Lorrain (2003), French poet, translator, musician
 Ben Dolnick (2004), writer, son of American biographer Edward Dolnick, member of the Ochs-Sulzberger family that owns The New York Times
 Danielle Valore Evans (2004), American fiction writer
 Adam Gidwitz (2004), author of best selling children's books
Alaya Dawn Johnson (2004), author and winner of the 2015 Andre Norton Award
Tongo Eisen-Martin (2004), poet laureate of San Francisco
 Victoria Loustalot (2006), American writer of memoir and essays
 Crystal Hana Kim (2009), writer, If You Leave Me
 Morgan Parker (2010), poet and Cave Canem Fellow
 Rachel Heng (2011), Singaporean writer
 Ben Philippe (2011), author, screenwriter, recipient of the 2020 William C. Morris Award
Rowan Hisayo Buchanan (2012), British-American writer, recipient of the Betty Trask Award and the Authors' Club Best First Novel Award
Yanyi (2013), American poet

Miscellaneous
 John Parke Custis* (1777), stepson of George Washington
 Philip Hamilton (1800), eldest son of Alexander Hamilton and Elizabeth Schuyler Hamilton
 David Augustus Clarkson (1810), landowner and grandson-in-law of Robert R. Livingston
 James Lenox (1818), bibliophile, founder of the Lenox Library, later incorporated into the New York Public Library; also founder of the Presbyterian Hospital
 John Lloyd Stephens (1822), explorer, archaeologist, Special Ambassador to Central America, and president of the Panama Railroad
 William R. Travers (1838), founder of the Travers Stakes
 William H. Herriman (1849), expatriate American art collector
Cornelius Jeremiah Vanderbilt* (1850), son of Cornelius Vanderbilt 
 Augustus Newbold Morris (1860), American socialite and former president of The Metropolitan Club
 Winthrop Rutherfurd (1884), American socialite known for his romance with Consuelo Vanderbilt and marriage to Lucy Mercer Rutherfurd, mistress of Franklin D. Roosevelt
Gavin Arthur (1922), San Francisco astrologer and sexologist and a grandson of U.S. President Chester A. Arthur
Oswald Jacoby (1922), American bridge player
 Fred Glazer (1958), librarian and director of the West Virginia Library Commission
 Arthur MacArthur IV (1960), son of General of the Army Douglas MacArthur
 Ashrita Furman (1976), holder of the most Guinness Book of World Records records
 Daniel Kottke (1977), college friend of Steve Jobs and 12th employee of Apple Inc.
 Sergey Kudrin (1981), American chess grandmaster and three-time winner of the U.S. Open Chess Championship
 Peter Bacanovic (1984), Martha Stewart's stockbroker; involved in the ImClone scandal
 Annie Duke (1987), professional poker player
 Greg Giraldo (1987), stand-up comedian
 Anna Ivey (1994), admissions counsellor
 Chubby Hubby or Aun Koh (1996), Singaporean food and travel blogger
 Tinsley Mortimer (1999), socialite and television personality
 Chloe Arnold (2002), Internationally acclaimed tap dancer
 La Carmina (2005), alternative blogger on Gothic and Japanese pop culture 
 John Cochran (2009), winner of Survivor: Caramoan
 Sara Ali Khan (2016), daughter of Indian actor, director Saif Ali Khan and actress Amrita Singh

References

Lists of people by university or college in New York City
People